= List of Phomopsis species =

This is a list of binomial names in the fungi genus Phomopsis Sacc. & Roum. (in the family of Diaporthaceae), with just accepted species and not including synonyms.

680 records are listed by Species Fungorum;

A long list of former Phomopsis species is at the end.

== A ==
- Phomopsis abietina (R. Hartig) Grove (1918)
- Phomopsis abrotani (Oudem.) Sacc. & D. Sacc. (1906)
- Phomopsis abutilonis Sacc. (1915)
- Phomopsis acaciae C.C. Chen (1967)
- Phomopsis acaciicola (Henn.) Died. (1911)
- Phomopsis acanthi (Sacc. & D. Sacc.) Grove (1920)
- Phomopsis acerina Pirone & J.C. Carter (1966)
- Phomopsis aceris (Höhn.) Sacc. & D. Sacc. (1906)
- Phomopsis acmella (Berk.) Petr. & Syd. (1924)
- Phomopsis adansoniae Li Ma, P.K. Chi & Z.D. Jiang (2004)
- Phomopsis aesculana (Sacc.) Petr. (1921)
- Phomopsis agapanthi Punith. & Spooner (2005)
- Phomopsis agrostidis Punith. & Spooner (2002)
- Phomopsis airae Punith. & Spooner (2002)
- Phomopsis albolutea (Dearn. & Barthol.) Petr. (1929)
- Phomopsis algerica Maire (1945)
- Phomopsis alhagi Woron. (1915)
- Phomopsis allamandae Petr. (1923)
- Phomopsis allescheriana (Henn.) Boerema, Loer. & Hamers (1996)
- Phomopsis almeidae Traverso & Spessa (1910)
- Phomopsis alni-incanae Sandu (1964)
- Phomopsis aloes-percrassae Trinchieri (1909)
- Phomopsis alpiniae Sousa da Câmara (1949)
- Phomopsis alsophilae (Syd. & P. Syd.) Aa (2002)
- Phomopsis amaranthi Ubrizsy & Vörös (1966)
- Phomopsis amazonica (Syd. & P. Syd.) Aa (2002)
- Phomopsis amelanchieris (Cooke) Grove (1917)
- Phomopsis amherstiae Ponnappa (1971)
- Phomopsis ampelopsidis Petr. (1917)
- Phomopsis amraii M.P. Srivast., Tandon, Bhargava & A.K. Ghosh (1966)
- Phomopsis amygdaliana Canonaco (1936)
- Phomopsis ananadis M.M. Xiang & P.K. Chi (1994)
- Phomopsis ananasae M.M. Xiang & P.K. Chi (2000)
- Phomopsis andina Petr. (1950)
- Phomopsis annonae Urries (1952)
- Phomopsis anthyllidicola (Henn.) Died. (1911)
- Phomopsis antigoni R.C. Rajak (1981)
- Phomopsis apocyni Pisareva & Philim. (1968)
- Phomopsis aquifolii (Brunaud) Keissl. (1913)
- Phomopsis aquilariae Punith. & I.A.S. Gibson (1978)
- Phomopsis araliae Koval (1961)
- Phomopsis araucariae Grove (1935)
- Phomopsis archeri B. Sutton (1980)
- Phomopsis arecae Syd. & P. Syd. (1914)
- Phomopsis aristolochiae Grove (1917)
- Phomopsis armeriae Grove (1930)
- Phomopsis arnoldiae B. Sutton (1980)
- Phomopsis artabotrydis Syd. & P. Syd. (1916)
- Phomopsis arthrophylli (Koord.) Aa (2002)
- Phomopsis artocarpi Syd. (1935)
- Phomopsis asclepiadea (Ellis & Everh.) Petr. (1951)
- Phomopsis asparagi (Sacc.) Grove (1935)
- Phomopsis asparagicola Alcalde (1952)
- Phomopsis asphodelina (Thüm.) Traverso & Spessa (1910)
- Phomopsis asteriscus (Berk & Broome) Grove (1917)
- Phomopsis aucubicola (Brunaud) Grove (1917)
- Phomopsis avellana Petr. (1921)

== B ==
- Phomopsis baccharidis Grove (1935)
- Phomopsis bakeri Syd. & P. Syd. (1913)
- Phomopsis baliospermi Suj. Singh & Kamal (1979)
- Phomopsis banksiae Novoss. (1936)
- Phomopsis barbari (Cooke) Punith. (2002)
- Phomopsis barringtoniae Kamal & R.P. Singh (1981)
- Phomopsis batatas (Ellis & Halst.) Harter & E.C. Field (1912)
- Phomopsis bauhiniae Alcalde (1952)
- Phomopsis bauhiniicola M.M. Xiang, Z.D. Jiang & P.K. Chi (2003)
- Phomopsis beckhausii (Cooke) Traverso (1906)
- Phomopsis begoniae Gutner (1936)
- Phomopsis berberina (Sacc. & Roum.) Grove (1919)
- Phomopsis bertholletianum E.R. Spencer (1921)
- Phomopsis bicincta Syd. (1926)
- Phomopsis biformis Bubák & Gonz. Frag. (1915)
- Phomopsis bignoniae Curzi & Barbaini (1927)
- Phomopsis biwa Hara (1954)
- Phomopsis bloxamii Grove (1917)
- Phomopsis boehmeriae Novoss. (1936)
- Phomopsis bossiaeae (Henn.) Died. (1911)
- Phomopsis bougainvilleae Sousa da Câmara (1951)
- Phomopsis brachyceras Grove (1935)
- Phomopsis brachysematis (Henn.) Died. (1911)
- Phomopsis brassicae Sacc. & Roum. (1884)
- Phomopsis brencklei Petr. (1924)
- Phomopsis brideliae Chowdhry (1966)
- Phomopsis broussonetiae (Sacc.) Died. (1911)
- Phomopsis brunaudiana (Sacc.) B. Sutton (1996)
- Phomopsis brunaudii (Pass.) Moesz (1931)
- Phomopsis bryophylli Sousa da Câmara & A.T. Vasconc. (1955)
- Phomopsis buddlejae Grove (1930)
- Phomopsis buettneriae Bond.-Mont. (1938)
- Phomopsis buteae V.P. Sahni (1968)
- Phomopsis buxi (Desm.) Höhn. (1920)
- Phomopsis buxicola P.K. Chi, C.Q. Chang & Z.D. Jiang (2007)

== C ==
- Phomopsis cacti (Berk.) Grove (1917)
- Phomopsis cajani Syd. & P. Syd. (1916)
- Phomopsis calanthes Sacc. (1916)
- Phomopsis callistephi Tehon & E.Y. Daniels (1925)
- Phomopsis calophacae (Henn.) Died. (1911)
- Phomopsis calotropidis (Gonz. Frag. & Cif.) Petr. (1929)
- Phomopsis calystegiae (Cooke) Grove (1917)
- Phomopsis camelliae-japonicae Petr. (1916)
- Phomopsis campanulae-latifoliae Petr. (1925)
- Phomopsis campomanesiae Bond.-Mont. (1936)
- Phomopsis campsidis M.T. Lucas & Sousa da Câmara (1954)
- Phomopsis canadensis Bubák & Dearn. (1916)
- Phomopsis cancri Punith. (1974)
- Phomopsis cannabina Curzi (1927)
- Phomopsis caraganae Bondartsev (1922)
- Phomopsis carludoviciae Novoss. (1936)
- Phomopsis carnea (Lib. ex Thüm.) Petr. (1921)
- Phomopsis carpogena (Sacc. & Roum.) Died. (1911)
- Phomopsis carposchiza Fairm. (1921)
- Phomopsis caryophylli (Cooke) Grove (1917)
- Phomopsis caryotae-urentis Petr. & Cif. (1930)
- Phomopsis cassiae Sousa da Câmara (1951)
- Phomopsis cassiicola M.M. Xiang, Z.D. Jiang & P.K. Chi (2003)
- Phomopsis castaneae Woron. (1915)
- Phomopsis casuarinae (Tassi) Died. (1912)
- Phomopsis catalpicola Alcalde (1952)
- Phomopsis caulographa (Durieu & Mont.) Grove (1917)
- Phomopsis cedrelae Sousa da Câmara (1932)
- Phomopsis celastrinae (Cooke) Bubák & Kabát (1912)
- Phomopsis celottii (Sacc.) M.T. Lucas & Sousa da Câmara (1952)
- Phomopsis cephaelidis (Bond.-Mont.) Aa & Vanev (2002)
- Phomopsis cephalotaxi Sawada (1950)
- Phomopsis cestri Syd. & P. Syd. (1917)
- Phomopsis chamaecristae Petr. (1952)
- Phomopsis choisyae Woron. (1916)
- Phomopsis chondrillae (Hollós) Dias & M.T. Lucas (1975)
- Phomopsis christianicola (Bat.) Vanev & Aa (2002)
- Phomopsis cichoracearum (Sacc.) Bubák (1906)
- Phomopsis cinnamomi S.M. Lin & P.K. Chi (1992)
- Phomopsis cinnamomicola Z.D. Jiang, M.M. Xiang & P.K. Chi (2003)
- Phomopsis cirsii Grove (1935)
- Phomopsis cistina (Cooke) Grove (1917)
- Phomopsis citriodora Grove (1930)
- Phomopsis cladrastidis Petr. (1934)
- Phomopsis clarkiae (Oudem.) Petr. (1925)
- Phomopsis clematidis S. Ahmad (1971)
- Phomopsis clerodendri Kamal & R.P. Singh (1981)
- Phomopsis clethrae Novoss. (1936)
- Phomopsis clypeata (Briard & Har.) Nannf. (1939)
- Phomopsis coccolobae Sacc. (1915)
- Phomopsis cocculi Maffei (1916)
- Phomopsis cocoes Petch (1922)
- Phomopsis cocophila (Speg.) Bond.-Mont. (1936)
- Phomopsis coffeae Bond.-Mont. (1936)
- Phomopsis colae Bond.-Mont. (1936)
- Phomopsis coluteae (Sacc. & Roum.) Died. (1911)
- Phomopsis combreticola Gutner (1936)
- Phomopsis commelinae Punith. (1975)
- Phomopsis conii Died. (1915)
- Phomopsis conspicua Syd. & P. Syd. (1920)
- Phomopsis convallariae (Westend.) Grove (1921)
- Phomopsis convolvulina Petr. (1925)
- Phomopsis copelandii Sacc. (1919)
- Phomopsis corchoricola A.Z.M. Khan & S.K. Das (1980)
- Phomopsis cordiae V. Nath & Bhargava (1977)
- Phomopsis cordifolia (Brunaud) Died. (1912)
- Phomopsis cordylines Ponnappa (1971)
- Phomopsis coriariicola Speg. (1910)
- Phomopsis coronillae (Westend.) Bubák (1906)
- Phomopsis correae (McAlpine) Vanev (2002)
- Phomopsis corticis (Fuckel) Grove (1918)
- Phomopsis corylopsidis (Henn.) Died. (1912)
- Phomopsis corynocarpi Sacc. (1915)
- Phomopsis crataegicola Petr. (1920)
- Phomopsis crini Chowdhry & D. Gupta (1986)
- Phomopsis crotalariae G.F. Weber (1933)
- Phomopsis crotonophila (Speg.) Aa (2002)
- Phomopsis cruciferae Grove (1917)
- Phomopsis cunninghamii Syd. (1924)
- Phomopsis cuscutae H.C. Greene (1964)
- Phomopsis cuspariae Gutner (1933)
- Phomopsis cyamopsidis Petr. & Syd. (1923)
- Phomopsis cycadis (Sacc. & Berl.) M.T. Lucas & Sousa da Câmara (1954)
- Phomopsis cyclobalanopsidis (C.C. Chen) Vanev & Aa (2002)
- Phomopsis cydoniae (Schulzer) Sacc. & Traverso (1911)
- Phomopsis cynanchi (Sousa da Câmara) Sousa da Câmara (1949)
- Phomopsis cynanchicola Petr. (1931)
- Phomopsis cynanchina Petr. (1922)
- Phomopsis cytisi Gonz. Frag. (1914)

== D ==
- Phomopsis dahliae Ponnappa (1971)
- Phomopsis dalbergiae Sacc. (1915)
- Phomopsis daturicola S. Ahmad (1971)
- Phomopsis dauci Arx (1951)
- Phomopsis daucicola Moesz (1920)
- Phomopsis dearnessiana (Sacc.) Arx (1957)
- Phomopsis delogneana Petr. (1925)
- Phomopsis dendrobii V.G. Rao & B.R.D. Yadav (1989)
- Phomopsis desmazieri (Durieu & Mont.) Grove (1930)
- Phomopsis destructa D.P.C. Rao, S.C. Agarwal & S.B. Saksena (1976)
- Phomopsis detrusa (Sacc.) Traverso (1906)
- Phomopsis deutziae N.F. Buchw. (1958)
- Phomopsis diachenii Sacc. (1915)
- Phomopsis dianthicola Sacc. (1915)
- Phomopsis dianthina Sacc. (1915)
- Phomopsis diaporthes macrostomae Traverso (1906)
- Phomopsis digitalis D. Hawksw. & Punith. (1973)
- Phomopsis dioscoreae Sacc. (1913)
- Phomopsis diospyri (Sacc.) Traverso & Spessa (1910)
- Phomopsis diplodinoides (Sacc.) Punith. (1988)
- Phomopsis dipsaci (Cooke) Grove (1917)
- Phomopsis dominici (Traverso) Sacc. & D. Sacc. (1903)
- Phomopsis dorycnii Petr. (1921)
- Phomopsis dracaenae V.P. Sahni (1968)
- Phomopsis dracaenicola Z.D. Jiang, P.G. Xi & P.K. Chi (2000)
- Phomopsis duabangae M.M. Xiang, Z.D. Jiang & P.K. Chi (2003)
- Phomopsis durandiana (Sacc. & Roum.) Died. (1911)
- Phomopsis durionis Syd. (1932)
- Phomopsis dysoxyli (Sacc.) Petr. (1957)

== E ==
- Phomopsis ebulina (Sacc. & Schulzer) Grove (1935)
- Phomopsis echioidis (Brunaud) Gonz. Frag. (1917)
- Phomopsis edgworthiae (Sacc.) Grove (1919)
- Phomopsis effusa (Roberge ex Desm.) Höhn. (1918)
- Phomopsis elaeagni Sacc. (1915)
- Phomopsis elaeagnicola C.Q. Chang, M.M. Xiang & P.K. Chi (2005)
- Phomopsis elaeidis Punith. (1974)
- Phomopsis elasticae Petr. (1916)
- Phomopsis elenkinii Lebedeva (1923)
- Phomopsis elliptica (Peck) Grove (1935)
- Phomopsis emicis R.G. Shivas (1992)
- Phomopsis emmanuelii Vegni (1964)
- Phomopsis endogena (Speg.) Cif. (1950)
- Phomopsis ephedrae Novoss. (1936)
- Phomopsis epicarpa Sacc. (1909)
- Phomopsis epiglandula (Tassi) Bond.-Mont. (1936)
- Phomopsis ericaceana Fairm. (1918)
- Phomopsis erini Sousa da Câmara (1936)
- Phomopsis eriobotryae Curzi (1927)
- Phomopsis eriodendri (Died.) Aa (2002)
- Phomopsis erythrinae (Petch) Petr. (1957)
- Phomopsis erythroxyli Novoss. (1938)
- Phomopsis escalloniae Grove (1935)
- Phomopsis eucalypti Zerova (1940)
- Phomopsis eugeniae Shreem. (1972)
- Phomopsis eumorpha Sacc. (1919)
- Phomopsis eupatoriicola Petr. (1922)
- Phomopsis euphorbiae (Sacc.) Traverso (1906)
- Phomopsis extorris Sacc. (1915)
- Phomopsis exul (Sacc.) Grove (1917)

== F ==
- Phomopsis fabae Ondřej (1991)
- Phomopsis fagopyri Traverso & Spessa (1910)
- Phomopsis familiaris (Sacc.) Gutner (1933)
- Phomopsis fatsiae-japonicae Petr. (1916)
- Phomopsis ficina Sacc. (1915)
- Phomopsis filicina H.C. Greene (1963)
- Phomopsis filiformis N.C. Mandal & M.K. Dasgupta (1984)
- Phomopsis firmianae Kamal, P. Kumar & R.P. Singh (1981)
- Phomopsis fischeri-eduardi Bubák (1916)
- Phomopsis flacourtiae S.M. Singh (1979)
- Phomopsis flueckigeriae (Gutner) Vanev & Aa (2002)
- Phomopsis foeniculi Du Manoir & Vegh (1981)
- Phomopsis folliculicola Punith. (1974)
- Phomopsis fontanesiae Alcalde (1952)
- Phomopsis fragosoana (Sousa da Câmara) Vanev & Aa (2002)
- Phomopsis fragosoi Bubák (1915)
- Phomopsis francoae Speg. (1910)
- Phomopsis fraterna Fairm. (1922)
- Phomopsis fraxinellae (Tassi) Petr. (1992)
- Phomopsis fuchsiae (Brunaud) E.K. Cash (1972)
- Phomopsis furcraeae Sacc. (1906)
- Phomopsis fusiformis N.C. Mandal & M.K. Dasgupta (1984)

== G ==
- Phomopsis garryae Grove (1922)
- Phomopsis garugae N.D. Sharma (1982)
- Phomopsis gasteriae Sacc. (1915)
- Phomopsis genistae-tinctoriae Petr. (1917)
- Phomopsis gevuinicola (Speg.) Aa (2002)
- Phomopsis ginkgonis Z.D. Jiang, C.Q. Chang & M.M. Xiang (2007)
- Phomopsis glandicola (Lév.) Grove (1917)
- Phomopsis glaziovae Bond.-Mont. (1936)
- Phomopsis gliricidiae Syd. & P. Syd. (1913)
- Phomopsis glycines Petr. (1936)
- Phomopsis gmelinae Sankaran, Florence & J.K. Sharma (1987)
- Phomopsis gnomoniae Petr. (1923)
- Phomopsis gomphocarpi Sousa da Câmara (1936)
- Phomopsis gomphrenae M.H. Li, Z.D. Jiang & P.K. Chi (2004)
- Phomopsis gorakhpurensis Kamal, P. Kumar & R.P. Singh (1981)
- Phomopsis grabowskiae Alcalde (1952)
- Phomopsis grewiae (Died.) Aa (2002)
- Phomopsis grossulariae Gutner (1928)
- Phomopsis guareae (Henn.) Aa (2002)
- Phomopsis guiyan Chuan F. Zhang & P.K. Chi (1996)
- Phomopsis guiyuan C.F. Zhang & P.K. Chi (2000)
- Phomopsis gulabii B. Lal & A. Arya (1981)
- Phomopsis gymnocladi Byzova (1968)

== H ==
- Phomopsis hakeae Lebedeva (1923)
- Phomopsis halimii Alcalde (1945)
- Phomopsis hameliae Gonz. Frag. & Cif. (1928)
- Phomopsis heckeriae (Henn.) Bat., R. Garnier & J.L. Bezerra (1966)
- Phomopsis hellebori (Briard & Har.) Traverso (1906)
- Phomopsis heraclei Lebedeva (1933)
- Phomopsis heritierae Novoss. (1936)
- Phomopsis herminierae (Cooke) Grove (1917)
- Phomopsis heteronema Sacc. (1913)
- Phomopsis heterophragmatis (Chona & Munjal) Vanev & Aa (2002)
- Phomopsis heveae (Petch) Boedijn (1929)
- Phomopsis heveicola Li Ma, M.M. Xiang & P.K. Chi (2004)
- Phomopsis hibisci Dearn. (1926)
- Phomopsis hieracii H.C. Greene (1953)
- Phomopsis hispaniolae (Cif. & Gonz. Frag.) Vanev & Aa (2002)
- Phomopsis hollboelliae Bond.-Mont. (1936)
- Phomopsis hranicensis Petr. (1921)
- Phomopsis hughesii N.D. Sharma (1982)
- Phomopsis hydnocarpi S.M. Lin & P.K. Chi (1992)
- Phomopsis hydrangeae M.T. Lucas & Sousa da Câmara (1952)
- Phomopsis hyperici Grove (1922)
- Phomopsis hysteriola (Sacc.) Grove (1935)

== I ==
- Phomopsis ichnocarpi Yesodh. & J.K. Sharma (1987)
- Phomopsis impatientis Dearn. & House (1921)
- Phomopsis inclusa Höhn. (1920)
- Phomopsis incommoda (Trail) Grove (1935)
- Phomopsis inconstans (Sacc.) Died. (1912)
- Phomopsis incrustans Died. (1911)
- Phomopsis indica Kamal, P. Kumar & R.P. Singh (1981)
- Phomopsis indigoferae (Sacc.) Traverso & Spessa (1910)
- Phomopsis ingae-dulcis (Died.) Aa (2002)
- Phomopsis inulina (Sacc.) Petr. (1929)
- Phomopsis iochromatis Gonz. Frag. (1917)
- Phomopsis ipomoeae Petr. (1922)
- Phomopsis iridina (Maire & Sacc.) M.T. Lucas & Sousa da Câmara (1952)
- Phomopsis iridis (Cooke) D. Hawksw. & Punith. (1975)
- Phomopsis irregularis (Died.) Petr. (1921)
- Phomopsis isorae S.M. Singh (1979)
- Phomopsis iteae (C.C. Chen) Vanev (2002)
- Phomopsis ixorae Chowdhry (1971)

== J ==
- Phomopsis jaczewskii Panas. (1929)
- Phomopsis jambosae Bond.-Mont. (1936)
- Phomopsis jasmini Petr. (1916)
- Phomopsis jaunpurensis R.C. Srivast. (1980)
- Phomopsis javanica Uecker & D.A. Johnson (1991)
- Phomopsis juglandina (Sacc.) Höhn. (1906)
- Phomopsis jurineae Morochk. (1933)
- Phomopsis justiciae (Tassi) M.T. Lucas & Sousa da Câmara (1953)

== K ==
- Phomopsis kentrophylli Ade (1929)
- Phomopsis kiggelariae (Henn.) Died. (1911)
- Phomopsis kochiana Gaja (1912)

== L ==
- Phomopsis lactucae (Sacc.) Bubák (1905)
- Phomopsis lagettae Gutner (1936)
- Phomopsis lamii Sacc. & D. Sacc. (1905)
- Phomopsis landolphiae Novoss. (1936)
- Phomopsis lantanae (M.E.A. Costa & Sousa da Câmara) B. Sutton (1980)
- Phomopsis lantanae-glutinosae J.M. Pereira & R.W. Barreto (2001)
- Phomopsis lathyrina (Sacc.) Grove (1920)
- Phomopsis latifolia (Ellis & Everh.) Vanev & Aa (2002)
- Phomopsis lauri Gutner (1933)
- Phomopsis laurina Petr. (1916)
- Phomopsis lavandulae (Gabotto) Cif. & Vegni (1964)
- Phomopsis lavaterae (Westend.) Died. (1921)
- Phomopsis lavitskii Zerova (1940)
- Phomopsis lebiseyi (Sacc.) Died. (1911)
- Phomopsis lentisci (Pass.) Sousa da Câmara (1951)
- Phomopsis lepidii (Sacc.) Sousa da Câmara (1949)
- Phomopsis leptographa (Sacc.) Petr. (1922)
- Phomopsis leucothoes (Henn.) Died. (1911)
- Phomopsis liatridis H.C. Greene (1949)
- Phomopsis libertii M. Morelet (1968)
- Phomopsis ligulata Grove (1935)
- Phomopsis ligustri-vulgaris Petr. (1921)
- Phomopsis limonii Vegh (1994)
- Phomopsis lirella (Desm.) Grove (1917)
- Phomopsis lirellata (Sacc.) Grove (1935)
- Phomopsis lirelliformis (Sacc.) Bubák (1915)
- Phomopsis liriodendri Grove (1930)
- Phomopsis lithocarpi Y.H. Gao, W. Sun & L. Cai (2013)
- Phomopsis litoralis Petr. (1931)
- Phomopsis litseae Kamal & R.P. Singh (1981)
- Phomopsis lixivia Höhn. (1915)
- Phomopsis lokoyae G.G. Hahn (1933)
- Phomopsis longanae P.K. Chi & Z.D. Jiang (1992)
- Phomopsis lonicerae (Cooke ex Sacc.) Grove (1917)
- Phomopsis lophanthi Sousa da Câmara (1936)
- Phomopsis loti J. Upadhyay (1966)
- Phomopsis lucumae Gutner (1936)
- Phomopsis lucumicola Z.D. Jiang & P.K. Chi (2000)
- Phomopsis ludwigii Petr. (1923)
- Phomopsis lueheae Novoss. (1936)
- Phomopsis lumae Syd. (1928)
- Phomopsis lusitanica Sousa da Câmara (1949)
- Phomopsis lyonsiae Petr. (1957)
- Phomopsis lysimachiae (Cooke) Grove (1917)

== M ==
- Phomopsis macadamii Z.D. Jiang & P.K. Chi (2000)
- Phomopsis machaeriicola Petr. (1953)
- Phomopsis macilenta (Roberge ex Desm.) Petr. (1929)
- Phomopsis macrocarpae P.G. Xi, Z.D. Jiang & P.K. Chi (2000)
- Phomopsis macrocollum Alcalde (1952)
- Phomopsis macrospora Tak. Kobay. & Chiba (1961)
- Phomopsis maculans Curzi & Barbaini (1927)
- Phomopsis magnoliicola (Syd. & P. Syd.) Died. (1911)
- Phomopsis magnoliina C.Q. Chang, Z.D. Jiang & P.K. Chi (2005)
- Phomopsis magocsyana Moesz (1924)
- Phomopsis mahoniae Grove (1930)
- Phomopsis mahothocarpi Y.H. Gao, W. Sun & L. Cai (2013)
- Phomopsis majuscula Sacc. (1906)
- Phomopsis malvacearum (Westend.) Died. (1912)
- Phomopsis mandevillae M.E.A. Costa & Sousa da Câmara (1952)
- Phomopsis mangiferae S. Ahmad (1954)
- Phomopsis mangrovei K.D. Hyde (1991)
- Phomopsis manilkarae R.K. Rajak & A.A.K. Chatterjee (1984)
- Phomopsis marrubii (Durieu & Mont.) Grove (1920)
- Phomopsis marsdeniae Petr. (1931)
- Phomopsis martyniae Speg. (1910)
- Phomopsis mastoidea M.E.A. Costa & Sousa da Câmara (1953)
- Phomopsis mauritiana G.Q. Yuan & J.G. Wei (2008)
- Phomopsis mayteni (Speg.) Aa (2002)
- Phomopsis mazzantioides Petr. (1921)
- Phomopsis medinillae Gutner (1936)
- Phomopsis mediterranea Sacc. (1913)
- Phomopsis melaleuca (Berk. & M.A. Curtis) Grove (1919)
- Phomopsis meliloti Grove (1930)
- Phomopsis melocacticola (Henn.) Died. (1912)
- Phomopsis menispermacearum Gonz. Frag. (1917)
- Phomopsis menispermi (Peck) Grove (1917)
- Phomopsis metrosideri (H. Mori) Petr. (1934)
- Phomopsis micheliae Sankaran, Florence & J.K. Sharma (1987)
- Phomopsis micheliicola Z.D. Jiang, P.K. Chi & M.M. Xiang (2002)
- Phomopsis microspora Kleb. (1933)
- Phomopsis millettiae Swarup, L.S. Chauhan & Tripathi (1966)
- Phomopsis mimusopis (Henn.) Aa (2002)
- Phomopsis mindoensis Petr. (1948)
- Phomopsis minuscula Grove (1922)
- Phomopsis missouriensis Bubák (1906)
- Phomopsis mongolica Petr. (1934)
- Phomopsis montanensis G.G. Hahn (1930)
- Phomopsis morearum (Brunaud) Curzi & Barbaini (1927)
- Phomopsis mori Voglino (1915)
- Phomopsis morifolia (Berl.) Petr. (1927)
- Phomopsis morphaea Sacc. (1884)
- Phomopsis muelleri (Cooke) Grove (1917)
- Phomopsis multipunctata (Sacc.) Died. (1911)
- Phomopsis muscorum Racov. (1941)
- Phomopsis musicola (F. Stevens & E. Young) Punith. (1975)
- Phomopsis myopori (Henn.) Died. (1911)
- Phomopsis myricae Y.J. Huang & P.K. Chi (2000)
- Phomopsis myricariae Syd. & P. Syd. (1913)
- Phomopsis myricina Y.J. Huang & P.K. Chi (2000)
- Phomopsis myriosticta Sacc. (1914)
- Phomopsis myrtilli Petr. (1924)

== N ==
- Phomopsis natsume Hara (1954)
- Phomopsis neeae (Bat. & Peres) Vanev & Aa (2002)
- Phomopsis nepetae Gonz. Frag. (1914)
- Phomopsis nephelii (Delacr.) Vanev & Aa (2002)
- Phomopsis nerii Zerova (1940)
- Phomopsis neriicola (Pat.) M.E.A. Costa & Sousa da Câmara (1952)
- Phomopsis nicotianae Fairm. (1923)
- Phomopsis nidulans (Grognot ex Sacc.) Höhn. (1915)
- Phomopsis nitidula (Sacc.) Grove (1917)
- Phomopsis nivea (Syd. & P. Syd.) Aa (2002)
- Phomopsis nymphaeae Nag Raj & Ponnappa (1970)

== O ==
- Phomopsis oblita Sacc. (1910)
- Phomopsis oemanthi Dzhalag. (1965)
- Phomopsis oenocarpi Bat., J.L. Bezerra & J.E.W. Castro (1964)
- Phomopsis oenocarpicola Bat. & R. Garnier (1966)
- Phomopsis oenotherae (Dearn.) Petr. (1929)
- Phomopsis oleariae Grove (1922)
- Phomopsis olisipponensis (Sousa da Câmara) Sousa da Câmara (1949)
- Phomopsis oliveirana Dias & Teixeira (1963)
- Phomopsis oncostoma (Thüm.) Höhn. (1917)
- Phomopsis ononidicola (Hollós) Moesz (1930)
- Phomopsis oppilata (Fr.) Petr. (1921)
- Phomopsis opulana Sacc. (1913)
- Phomopsis orchidophila E.K. Cash & A.M.J. Watson (1955)
- Phomopsis oreodaphnes (Henn.) Aa (2002)
- Phomopsis orobanches Grove (1933)
- Phomopsis orysopsidis M.T. Lucas & Sousa da Câmara (1955)
- Phomopsis oryzae Punith. (1975)
- Phomopsis oryzae-sativae Punith. (1980)
- Phomopsis osmanthi Dzhalag. (1965)
- Phomopsis osyridis Bubák (1906)
- Phomopsis ougeiniae R.K. Verma, Soni & N. Sharma (2008)
- Phomopsis oxalina (Ellis & Everh.) Syd. (1930)
- Phomopsis oxydendri (Ellis & Everh.) Aa (2002)
- Phomopsis oxyspora Petr. (1953)

== P ==
- Phomopsis padina (Sacc.) Died. (1912)
- Phomopsis pallida (Fuckel) Sacc. & D. Sacc. (1906)
- Phomopsis pandani Died. (1916)
- Phomopsis papayae Gonz. Frag. & Cif. (1926)
- Phomopsis parabolica Petr. (1927)
- Phomopsis pardalota Died. (1912)
- Phomopsis parrotiae Ratiani (1969)
- Phomopsis paspali Deshmukh, Kanitkar & G.S. Pendse (1975)
- Phomopsis passiflorae J.F. Lue & P.K. Chi (1992)
- Phomopsis paui Gonz. Frag. (1914)
- Phomopsis pavgii D.D. Shukla, V.N. Pathak & M. Rao (1970)
- Phomopsis pavoniae Novoss. (1936)
- Phomopsis pedilanthi B. Lal & A. Arya (1982)
- Phomopsis pehenningsii N.D. Sharma (1982)
- Phomopsis pelargonii Vörös (1959)
- Phomopsis pergulariae Kamal, P. Kumar & R.P. Singh (1981)
- Phomopsis perniciosa Grove (1935)
- Phomopsis petersii Died. (1911)
- Phomopsis petiolorum (Desm.) Grove (1917)
- Phomopsis phellodendri Nann. (1932)
- Phomopsis philodendri Z.D. Jiang, X.H. Zheng & P.K. Chi (2000)
- Phomopsis phlyctaenoides (Berk. & M.A. Curtis) Höhn. (1916)
- Phomopsis phormiicola Sacc. (1915)
- Phomopsis phyllanthi Punith. (1975)
- Phomopsis phyllochlamydis Novoss. (1936)
- Phomopsis phyllophila Petr. (1920)
- Phomopsis phyteumatis Petr. (1922)
- Phomopsis phytolaccae (Berk. & M.A. Curtis) Grove (1917)
- Phomopsis pilocarpicola (Sousa da Câmara) Vanev & Aa (2002)
- Phomopsis pimpinellae (Ellis) H.C. Greene (1953)
- Phomopsis pinophylla Höhn. (1918)
- Phomopsis pircuniae Sacc. (1915)
- Phomopsis pisicola Petr. & Cif. (1930)
- Phomopsis pitcairniae Bond.-Mont. (1936)
- Phomopsis pittospori (Cooke & Harkn.) Grove (1919)
- Phomopsis plantaginis Kurbans. (1980)
- Phomopsis platanoidis (Cooke) Died. (1912)
- Phomopsis platycerii (Tassi) Aa (2002)
- Phomopsis pleromatis (Speg.) Aa (2002)
- Phomopsis plumeriae N.D. Sharma (1975)
- Phomopsis podalyriae (Henn.) Died. (1911)
- Phomopsis podocarpi C.Q. Chang, Z.D. Jiang & P.K. Chi (2005)
- Phomopsis podophylli (Cooke) Grove (1917)
- Phomopsis polyalthiae Shreem. (1984)
- Phomopsis polygalae-myrtifoliae (Henn.) Dias & Sousa da Câmara (1952)
- Phomopsis polygonorum (Cooke) Grove (1917)
- Phomopsis populina Voglino (1909)
- Phomopsis porteri A. Funk (1975)
- Phomopsis praetervisa Grove (1919)
- Phomopsis prosopidicola (Speg.) Aa (2002)
- Phomopsis pruni (Ellis & Dearn.) Wehm. (1926)
- Phomopsis prunorum (Cooke) Grove (1917)
- Phomopsis psidii Nag Raj & Ponnappa (1974)
- Phomopsis psoraleae Bubák (1906)
- Phomopsis pteleae Panas. (1938)
- Phomopsis pterocariicola Li Ma, Z.D. Jiang & P.K. Chi (2004)
- Phomopsis pterospermi Bond.-Mont. (1936)
- Phomopsis punicae C.W. Guo & P.K. Chi (2000)
- Phomopsis punicicola C.Q. Chang, Z.D. Jiang & P.K. Chi (2005)
- Phomopsis putranjivae Kamal, P. Kumar & R.P. Singh (1981)
- Phomopsis pyrorum Sacc. & Trotter (1920)
- Phomopsis pyrrhocystis Petr. (1920)

== Q ==
- Phomopsis quercicola Moesz (1921)
- Phomopsis quercina (Sacc.) Höhn. ex Died. (1911)
- Phomopsis quercus (Sacc. & Speg.) Curzi & Barbaini (1927)

== R ==
- Phomopsis radula (Berk. & Broome) Grove (1917)
- Phomopsis ramealis (Desm.) Died. (1911)
- Phomopsis ramicola (Petch) Aa (2002)
- Phomopsis ranojevicii Bubák (1910)
- Phomopsis rapaneae (Speg.) Aa (2002)
- Phomopsis rhagadioli Novoss. (1938)
- Phomopsis rhaphidis Gonz. Frag. (1917)
- Phomopsis rhaphithamni (Speg.) Aa (2002)
- Phomopsis rhapidis Gonz. Frag. (1917)
- Phomopsis rhinanthi (Sommerf.) Arx (1957)
- Phomopsis rhizophorae Bat. & H. Maia (1955)
- Phomopsis rhododendri Z.D. Jiang, M.M. Xiang & P.K. Chi (2003)
- Phomopsis rhododendricola Li Ma, M.M. Xiang & P.K. Chi (2004)
- Phomopsis rhodophila (Sacc.) N.F. Buchw. (1958)
- Phomopsis rhodotypi (Henn.) Died. (1911)
- Phomopsis rhynchosiae Novoss. (1936)
- Phomopsis ribatejana Sousa da Câmara (1948)
- Phomopsis ricinella Petr. (1916)
- Phomopsis robergeana (Sacc.) Died. (1911)
- Phomopsis rojana Gaja (1911)
- Phomopsis rosae (Schulzer & Sacc.) Died. (1911)
- Phomopsis rubiseda Fairm. (1922)
- Phomopsis rudgeae Novoss. (1936)
- Phomopsis rusci (Westend.) Grove (1935)
- Phomopsis rutae (Henn.) Died. (1915)

== S ==
- Phomopsis sabaleos (Ces.) Bond.-Mont. (1936)
- Phomopsis sabiae Gutner (1936)
- Phomopsis sacchari Punith. (1975)
- Phomopsis salicina (Westend.) Died. (1911)
- Phomopsis salmalica A.H. Khan (1961)
- Phomopsis salviae (Brunaud) Traverso (1915)
- Phomopsis sapindacearum Bond.-Mont. (1936)
- Phomopsis sapindi (Pat.) Sacc. (1915)
- Phomopsis sapotae B. Lal & T.R.N. Rai (1980)
- Phomopsis saxegothaeae Syd. (1928)
- Phomopsis scabella (Penz.) Curzi (1925)
- Phomopsis schefflerae P.G. Xi, P.K. Chi & Z.D. Jiang (2003)
- Phomopsis schlerotioides H.A. Kerst. (1967)
- Phomopsis schoenocauli Syd. (1930)
- Phomopsis sclareae Sarwar (1977)
- Phomopsis scobinella Sacc. & D. Sacc. (1906)
- Phomopsis scutellariae Bond.-Mont. (1945)
- Phomopsis scutiae (Speg.) Aa (2002)
- Phomopsis sedi Punith. (1974)
- Phomopsis serebrianikowii (Bubák) Höhn. (1917)
- Phomopsis serjaniae Gutner (1936)
- Phomopsis seseli Lobik (1928)
- Phomopsis sidae Traverso (1915)
- Phomopsis silenes D. Hawksw. & Punith. (1975)
- Phomopsis similis Bubák (1915)
- Phomopsis siphonodontis (Sacc.) Aa & Vanev (2002)
- Phomopsis skimmiae Grove (1933)
- Phomopsis smilacina Gonz. Frag. (1916)
- Phomopsis smilacis J.F. Lue & P.K. Chi (1994)
- Phomopsis smyrnii (Sousa da Câmara) M.T. Lucas & Sousa da Câmara (1955)
- Phomopsis solani Grove (1917)
- Phomopsis sorbicola Grove (1930)
- Phomopsis sorbina Sacc. (1915)
- Phomopsis sorghi Morochk. (1933)
- Phomopsis sorghicola Punith. (1975)
- Phomopsis spartii (Sacc.) Died. (1911)
- Phomopsis spiraeae (Desm.) Grove (1920)
- Phomopsis spironemae Gonz. Frag. (1917)
- Phomopsis staphyleae Höhn. (1916)
- Phomopsis stellariae (L.A. Kirchn.) Petr. (1921)
- Phomopsis stenocarpi (Tassi) Gutner (1936)
- Phomopsis sterculiae S.M. Lin & P.K. Chi (1992)
- Phomopsis sterculicola Z.D. Jiang & P.K. Chi (2000)
- Phomopsis stewartii Peck (1910)
- Phomopsis stictostoma (Grove) Grove (1923)
- Phomopsis stillingiae (Ellis & Everh.) Aa (2002)
- Phomopsis striiformis (Durieu & Mont.) Grove (1917)
- Phomopsis stromatigena Maire (1917)
- Phomopsis subnervisequa (Desm.) Höhn. (1918)
- Phomopsis swainsonae (Henn.) Died. (1911)
- Phomopsis symploci Petr. (1940)
- Phomopsis syncarpiae Gutner (1936)
- Phomopsis syngenesia (Brunaud) Höhn. (1917)
- Phomopsis syzigii Z.D. Jiang & P.K. Chi (2000)
- Phomopsis syzygiicola Li Ma, Z.D. Jiang & P.K. Chi (2004)

== T ==
- Phomopsis tabernaemontanae Ponnappa & Nag Raj (1974)
- Phomopsis tamaricaria (Sacc.) Grove (1935)
- Phomopsis tamarindi A. Arya, C. Arya, R. Agarwal & B. Lal (1999)
- Phomopsis tami (Lambotte & Fautrey) Petr. (1921)
- Phomopsis tecomae (Sacc.) Traverso & Spessa (1910)
- Phomopsis tectonae D.P. Tiwari, R.C. Rajak & Nikhra (1981)
- Phomopsis templetoniae (Henn.) Died. (1911)
- Phomopsis tenuipes (Tassi) Aa (2002)
- Phomopsis tephrosiae Chowdhry (1967)
- Phomopsis teramni Hasija (1963)
- Phomopsis terminaliae (Henn.) B. Sutton (1980)
- Phomopsis ternstroemiae Y.H. Gao, W. Sun & L. Cai (2013)
- Phomopsis tezpatae S.M. Singh (1979)
- Phomopsis thalictri H.C. Greene (1963)
- Phomopsis thalictrina (Sacc. & Malbr.) Died. (1911)
- Phomopsis theicola Curzi (1926)
- Phomopsis theobromae (J.V. Almeida & Sousa da Câmara) Bond.-Mont. (1936)
- Phomopsis thermopsidis N.F. Buchw. (1958)
- Phomopsis thespesiae Luke & C.N. Reddy (1979)
- Phomopsis thevetiae M.M. Xiang, Z.D. Jiang & P.K. Chi (2003)
- Phomopsis thujae Died. (1912)
- Phomopsis tinea (Sacc.) Höhn. (1911)
- Phomopsis tipuanae (Tassi) M.T. Lucas & Sousa da Câmara (1952)
- Phomopsis tirrenica Moriondo (1961)
- Phomopsis tomentosae Purkay. & Mallik (1976)
- Phomopsis tommaseana Gaja (1912)
- Phomopsis toxicodendri (Henn.) Died. (1911)
- Phomopsis trachelii Gonz. Frag. (1917)
- Phomopsis tragopogonis Sandu & Mítítíuc (1971)
- Phomopsis trematis Ponnappa & Nag Raj (1974)
- Phomopsis trichiliae Petr. & Cif. (1932)
- Phomopsis trichosanthis Bond.-Mont. (1938)
- Phomopsis tritici Punith. (1980)
- Phomopsis trochodendri (J.V. Almeida & Sousa da Câmara) Vanev (2002)
- Phomopsis trollii Fairm. (1922)
- Phomopsis tropaeoli Punith. & Spooner (1999)
- Phomopsis truncicola Miura (1928)

== U ==
- Phomopsis ulmicola Petr. (1921)
- Phomopsis umbrina (Bonord.) Bubák (1916)
- Phomopsis urticicola Traverso & Spessa (1910)

== V ==
- Phomopsis variabilis (Penz. & Sacc.) Höhn. (1920)
- Phomopsis variosporum J.K. Sharma, C.N. Mohanan & Florence (1985)
- Phomopsis venenosa (Sacc.) Traverso & Spessa (1910)
- Phomopsis verbasci D. Hawksw. & Punith. (1973)
- Phomopsis veronicae-speciosae (Henn.) Died. (1911)
- Phomopsis viciae Bubák (1915)
- Phomopsis vicina (Desm. ex Sacc.) Grove (1917)
- Phomopsis viennot-bourginii Moesz (1938)
- Phomopsis vignae (Speg.) Aa & Vanev (2002)
- Phomopsis villaresiae Gutner (1933)
- Phomopsis vincentiana (Speg.) M.T. Lucas & Sousa da Câmara (1954)
- Phomopsis viridarii (Sacc.) Traverso & Spessa (1913)
- Phomopsis vismiae Petr. (1950)
- Phomopsis viterbensis Camici (1948)
- Phomopsis viticis Urries (1952)
- Phomopsis voitiae Ohl (1915)

== W/X ==
- Phomopsis wampi C.F. Zhang & P.K. Chi (2000)

- Phomopsis xanthii Vörös (1959)
- Phomopsis xylocarpi Purkay. & A.K. Pal bis (1996)

== Y/Z ==
- Phomopsis yuccae V.P. Sahni (1968)

- Phomopsis zeicola M.E.A. Costa & Sousa da Câmara (1954)
- Phomopsis zelkovae Ratiani (1969)
- Phomopsis zijingensis Y.J. Huang & P.K. Chi (2000)
- Phomopsis ziziphicola C.Q. Chang, Z.D. Jiang & P.K. Chi (2005)
- Phomopsis ziziphina Ponnappa (1971)

== Former species ==
As of 2023; N Note as many Phomopsis species were transferred to genus Diaporthe in the family Diaporthaceae, assume all below are Diaporthaceae unless mentioned.

- P. abdita (Sacc.) Traverso (1906) = Diaporthe abdita,
- P. achilleae (Sacc.) Traverso (1906) = Diaporthe orthoceras,
- P. aegles Traverso (1904) = Phoma aegles, Didymellaceae
- P. ailanthi (Sacc.) Died. (1912) = Diaporthe tuberculosa
- P. albicans (Roberge ex Desm.) Syd. & P. Syd. (1911) = Stemphylium vesicarium, Pleosporaceae
- P. alnea (Nitschke ex Sacc.) Höhn. (1906) = Diaporthe alnea
- P. amaranthicola Rosskopf, Charud. & DeVal. (1993) = Diaporthe amaranthophila
- P. amaranthicola Rosskopf, Charud., Shabana & Benny (2000) = Diaporthe amaranthophila
- P. amaranthophila Inácio, Dianese & Carlos (1999) = Diaporthe amaranthophila
- P. ambigua (Nitschke) Traverso (1906) = Diaporthe eres
- P. ampelina (Berk. & M.A. Curtis) Grove (1919) = Diaporthe ampelina
- P. amygdali (Delacr.) J.J. Tuset & M.T. Portilla (1989) = Diaporthe amygdali
- P. anacardii Early & Punith. (1972) = Diaporthe anacardii
- P. annonacearum Bond.-Mont. (1936) = Diaporthe annonacearum
- P. aquilariae var. nigra Punith. & I.A.S. Gibson (1977) = Phomopsis aquilariae
- P. aquilina (C. Massal.) Petr. (1921) = Massalongina aquilina, Ascomycota
- P. arctii (Lasch) Traverso (1906) = Diaporthe arctii
- P. atriplicina (Westend.) Grove (1920) = Stagonospora atriplicis, Phaeosphaeriaceae
- P. aucubae (Westend.) Traverso (1906) = Diaporthe aucubae
- P. aucubae f. ramulicola (Sacc.) Traverso (1906) = Diaporthe aucubae
- P. averrhoae C.Q. Chang, Z.D. Jiang & P.K. Chi (2005) = Diaporthe averrhoae
- P. azadirachtae Sateesh, Shank. Bhat & Devaki (1997) = Diaporthe azadirachtae
- P. berberidis Petr. (1925) = Phyllosticta westendorpii, Phyllostictaceae
- P. bossiaeae var. bossiaeae-alatae (Henn.) Died. (1911) = Phomopsis bossiaeae
- P. bougainvilleicola M.M. Xiang, Z.D. Jiang & P.K. Chi (2003) = Diaporthe bougainvilleicola
- P. boycei G.G. Hahn (1930) = Potebniamyces balsamicola, Phacidiaceae
- P. brevistylospora Tak. Kobay. & Tak. Ohsawa (1989) = Diaporthe melonis
- P. cajani (Rangel) Cif. (1961) = Phoma cajani, Didymellaceae
- P. californica H.S. Fawc. (1922) = Diaporthe citri,
- P. camptothecae C.Q. Chang, Z.D. Jiang & P.K. Chi (2005) = Diaporthe camptothecae
- P. capsici (Magnaghi) Sacc. (1916) = Diaporthe capsici
- P. caribaea W.T. Horne (1922) = Diaporthe citri
- P. caricae-papayae Petr. & Cif. (1930) = Diaporthe caricae-papayae
- P. castanea (Sacc.) Petr. (1921) = Dendrostoma castaneum, Diaporthales
- P. castaneae-mollissimae S.X. Jiang & H.B. Ma (2010) = Diaporthe castaneae-mollissimae
- P. chamaeropis (Cooke) Petr. (1920) = Diaporthe chamaeropis
- P. chimonanthi C.Q. Chang, M.M. Xiang & P.K. Chi (2005) = Diaporthe chimonanthi
- P. chionanthi Died. (1911) = Diaporthe chionanthi
- P. chrysanthemi (Voglino) M.E.A. Costa & Sousa da Câmara (1952) = Stagonosporopsis ligulicola, Didymellaceae
- P. cinerascens (Sacc.) Traverso (1906) = Diaporthe cinerascens
- P. citri H.S. Fawc. (1912) = Diaporthe citri
- P. cocoina (Cooke) Punith. (1975) = Diaporthe cocoina
- P. columnaris D.F. Farr & Castl. (2002) = Diaporthe columnaris
- P. coluteae var. longipes M.E.A. Costa & Sousa da Câmara (1954) = Phomopsis coluteae
- P. coneglanensis (Sacc.) Traverso (1906) = Diaporthe coneglanensis
- P. conorum (Sacc.) Died. (1911) = Diaporthe eres
- P. conorum var. naviculispora Traverso (1912) = Diaporthe eres
- P. consocia (Sacc., E. Bommer & M. Rousseau) Died. (1911) = Diaporthe hippophaes
- P. controversa (Desm.) Traverso (1906) = Diaporthe eres
- P. convolvuli Ormeno-Nuñez, Reeleder & A.K. Watson (1988) = Diaporthe convolvuli
- P. cotoneastri Punith. (1973) = Diaporthe cotoneastri
- P. crustosa (Sacc., E. Bommer & M. Rousseau) Traverso (1906) = Diaporthe crustosa
- P. crustosa f. minuscula A.C. Santos & Sousa da Câmara (1955) = Diaporthe crustosa
- P. cryptica (Nitschke) Höhn. (1906) = Diaporthe cryptica
- P. cucurbitae McKeen (1957) = Diaporthe cucurbitae
- P. cuppatea E. Jansen, Lampr. & Crous (2006) = Diaporthe cuppatea
- P. cytosporella (Penz. & Sacc.) H.S. Fawc. & H.A. Lee (1926) = Diaporthe cytosporella
- P. decedens (Pers.) Grove (1935) = Diaporthe decedens
- P. decedens var. conjuncta (Nees) Grove (1935) = Diaporthe conjuncta
- P. demissa (Sacc.) Traverso (1906) = Diaporthe demissa
- P. denigrata (Desm.) Traverso (1913) = Diaporthe desmazieri
- P. depressa (Lév.) Traverso (1906) = Diaporthe incarcerata
- P. desmazieri var. phlomidis Grove (1930) = Phomopsis desmazieri
- P. destruens (Harter) Boerema, Loer. & Hamers (1996) = Diaporthe destruens
- P. dulcamarae (Sacc.) Traverso (1906) = Diaporthe dulcamarae
- P. effusa (Lib.) B. Sutton (1967) = Apiognomonia erythrostoma, Gnomoniaceae
- P. elaeagni (J.C. Carter & Sacamano) R.H. Arnold & J.C. Carter (1974) = Phomopsis arnoldiae
- P. enteroleuca (Sacc.) Wollenw. & Hochapfel (1936) = Plenodomus enteroleucus, Pleosporales
- P. epilobii (Preuss) Petr. (1921) = Didymella epilobii, Didymellaceae
- P. equiseti (Desm.) Petr. (1922) = Ascochyta equiseti, Didymellaceae
- P. eres (Nitschke) Grove (1918) = Diaporthe eres
- P. eryngiicola (Brunaud) Traverso (1906) = Diaporthopsis nigrella
- P. eucalypticola Old & Z.Q. Yuan (1995) = Diaporthe eucalypticola
- P. eucommiae F.X. Chao & P.K. Chi (1990) = Diaporthe eucommiae
- P. eucommiicola C.Q. Chang, Z.D. Jiang & P.K. Chi (2005) = Diaporthe eucommiicola
- P. eugeniae Punith. (1974) = Diaporthe eugeniae
- P. fibrosa (Sacc.) Höhn. (1929) = Fusicoccum fibrosum, Botryosphaeriaceae
- P. foveolaris (Fr.) Traverso (1906) = Dothichiza foveolaris, Dothioraceae
- P. fukushii S. Tanaka & S. Endô (1927) = Diaporthe fukushii
- P. ganjae McPartl. (1983) = Diaporthe ganjae
- P. gardeniae Buddin & Wakef. (1938) = Diaporthe gardeniae
- P. glabrae C.Q. Chang, Z.D. Jiang & P.K. Chi (2005) = Diaporthe glabrae
- P. gloriosa (Sacc.) Traverso (1906) = Diaporthe gloriosa
- P. helianthi Munt.-Cvetk., Mihaljč. & M. Petrov (1981) = Diaporthe helianthi
- P. hordei Punith. (1975) = Diaporthe hordei
- P. hystericola (Sacc.) Grove (1935) = Phomopsis hysteriola
- P. hysteriola f. veronicae Grove (1920) = Phomopsis hysteriola
- P. ilicis (Desm.) Höhn. (1988) = Phoma ilicis, Didymellaceae
- P. importata (Nitschke) Dietel (1911) = Diaporthe importata
- P. inaequalis Traverso (1906) = Diaporthe inaequalis
- P. incarcerata Höhn. (1906) = Diaporthe incarcerata
- P. intermedia (Sacc.) Traverso (1906) = Diaporthe intermedia
- P. ipomoeae-batatas Punith. (1982) = Phyllosticta batatas, Phyllostictaceae
- P. japonica (Sacc.) Traverso (1906) = Diaporthe japonica
- P. juniperivora G.G. Hahn (1920) = Diaporthe juniperivora
- P. kalmiae Enlows (1918) = Diaporthe kalmiae
- P. lagerstroemiae C.Q. Chang, M.M. Xiang & P.K. Chi (2005) = Diaporthe lagerstroemiae
- P. landeghemiae (Westend.) Höhn. (1906) = Diaporthe landeghemiae
- P. laurella (Sacc.) Traverso (1906) = Diaporthe nobilis
- P. leptostromiformis (J.G. Kühn) Bubák (1913) = Diaporthe leptostromiformis
- P. leptostromiformis var. occidentalis R.G. Shivas, J.G. Allen & P.M. Will. (1991) = Diaporthe leptostromiformis
- P. leycesteriae Grove (1930) = Diaporthe leycesteriae
- P. linearis (Sacc.) Traverso (1906) = Clypeoporthe linearis, Gnomoniaceae
- P. liquidambaris C.Q. Chang, Z.D. Jiang & P.K. Chi (2005) = Diaporthe liquidambaris
- P. lirelliformis f. gredensis Gonz. Frag. (1919) = Phomopsis lirelliformis
- P. lirelliformis var. phyllobia Bubák & Gonz. Frag. (1915) = Phomopsis lirelliformis
- P. lobeliae (Berk. & Broome) Petch (1919) = Coniothyrium lobeliae, Coniothyriaceae
- P. longicolla Hobbs (1985) = Diaporthe longicolla
- P. longiparaphysata Uecker & K.C. Kuo (1992) = Diaporthe longiparaphysata
- P. loropetali C.Q. Chang, Z.D. Jiang & P.K. Chi (2005) = Diaporthe loropetali
- P. magnoliae M.M. Xiang, Z.D. Jiang & P.K. Chi (2002) = Diaporthe magnoliicola
- P. mahoniicola (Pass.) Keissl. (1922) = Phyllosticta mahoniicola, Phyllostictaceae
- P. mali Roberts (1912) = Phomopsis prunorum
- P. mali (Schulzer & Sacc.) Died. (1912) = Phomopsis prunorum
- P. manihot (Speg.) Chevaug. (1956) = Diaporthe manihotis
- P. manihotis Swarup, L.S. Chauhan & Tripathi (1966) = Diaporthe manihotis
- P. mendax (Sacc.) Traverso (1906) = Diaporthe mendax
- P. micheliae C.Q. Chang, Z.D. Jiang & P.K. Chi (2005) = Diaporthe micheliae
- P. minutula (Sacc.) Weindlm. (1966) = Phoma minutula, Didymellaceae
- P. moricola (Sacc.) Grove (1915) = Diaporthe mori
- P. musae P. Joly (1961) = Didymella musae, Didymellaceae
- P. nepetae (Sousa da Câmara) Sousa da Câmara (1949) = Phomopsis emmanuelii
- P. oblonga (Desm.) Traverso (1906) = Diaporthe eres
- P. obscurans (Ellis & Everh.) B. Sutton (1965) = Paraphomopsis obscurans, Melanconiellaceae
- P. occidentalis (Sacc.) Traverso (1906) = Diaporthe occidentalis
- P. occidentalis var. irregularis (Traverso) Sacc., D. Sacc. & Traverso (1906) = Diaporthe occidentalis
- P. occulta Traverso (1906) = Macrodiaporthe occulta, Melanconidaceae
- P. occulta var. ginkgoina Grove (1935) = Macrodiaporthe occulta, Melanconidaceae
- P. occulta var. thujae (Died.) Grove (1935) = Phomopsis thujae
- P. ophites (Sacc.) Traverso (1906) = Diaporthe eres
- P. palmicola (G. Winter) Sacc. (1931) = Diaporthe palmicola
- P. palmicola f. arecae Sacc. (1915) = Diaporthe palmicola
- P. parietariae (Allesch.) M.E.A. Costa & Sousa da Câmara (1952) = Phoma parietariae, Didymellaceae
- P. perexigua Traverso (1906) = Boeremia exigua, Didymellaceae
- P. perseae Zerova (1940) = Diaporthe perseae
- P. phaseoli (Desm.) Sacc. (1915) = Diaporthe phaseolorum
- P. phaseoli f.sp. caulivora Kulik (1984) = Diaporthe phaseolorum
- P. phillyreae (Sacc.) Arx (1957) = Phyllosticta phillyreae Phyllostictaceae
- P. phoenicicola Traverso & Spessa (1910) = Diaporthe phoenicicola
- P. phomoides (Sacc.) Arx (1957) = Colletotrichum coccodes Glomerellaceae
- P. phyllanthicola C.Q. Chang, Z.D. Jiang & P.K. Chi (2005) = Diaporthe phyllanthicola
- P. piceae (Pers.) Höhn. (1906) = Diaporthe picea
- P. piceae f. obiones Grove (1935) = Diaporthe picea
- P. pittospori S.A. Archer (1973) = Phomopsis archeri
- P. pseudacaciae (Sacc.) Höhn. (1917) = Phomopsis petiolorum
- P. pseudotsugae M. Wilson (1920) = Allantophomopsiella pseudotsugae, Phacidiaceae
- P. pterocarpi S. Hughes (1953) = Diaporthe pterocarpi
- P. pterophila Nitschke ex Died. (1911) = Diaporthe samaricola
- P. pulla (Sacc.) Traverso (1906) = Diaporthe pulla
- P. pungens (Nitschke ex Sacc.) Grove (1935) = Diaporthe pungens
- P. pustulata (Sacc.) Died. (1911) = Diaporthe niessliana
- P. putator (Nitschke) Traverso (1906) = Diaporthe putator
- P. quercella (Sacc. & Roum.) Died. (1911) = Phomopsis quercina
- P. revellens (Sacc.) Traverso (1906) = Diaporthe revellens
- P. rhois (Sacc.) Traverso (1906) = Diaporthe rhois
- P. ribesia (Sacc.) Died. (1911) = Diaporthe pungens
- P. ribicola (Sacc.) Grove (1919) = Diaporthe strumella
- P. ribis (Magnus) Grove ex E.K. Cash (1972) = Eutypa lata, Diatrypaceae
- P. rossiana (Sacc.) Sacc. & D. Sacc. (1906) = Diaporthe woodii
- P. rubiae (Sacc.) Traverso (1906) = Diaporthe rubiae
- P. rudis (Sacc.) Höhn. (1906) = Diaporthe rudis
- P. rudis (Fr.) Höhn. (1912) = Diaporthe rudis
- P. ryckholtii (Sacc.) Höhn. (1906) = Diaporthe ryckholtii
- P. saccarata J.C. Kang, L. Mostert & Crous (2001) = Diaporthe saccarata
- P. salicina f. longipes Sousa da Câmara (1949) = Phomopsis salicina
- P. samarorum (Desm.) Höhn. (1920) = Neosetophoma samarorum Phaeosphaeriaceae
- P. sambucella (Sacc.) Traverso (1906) = Diaporthe spiculosa
- P. sambucina (Sacc.) Traverso (1906) = Diaporthe circumscripta
- P. sambucina f. petrakiana (Sacc.) Petr. (1921) = Diaporthe circumscripta
- P. sarmentella (Sacc.) Traverso (1906) = Diaporthe sarmenticia
- P. sarothamni Höhn. (1906) = Diaporthe sarothamni
- P. scabra (Sacc.) Traverso (1906) = Diaporthe scabra
- P. schini (Carranza) B. Sutton (1968) = Myxosporella schini, Ascomycota
- P. sclerotioides Kesteren (1967) = Diaporthe sclerotioides
- P. scobina Höhn. (1906) = Diaporthe scobina
- P. semiimmersa (Sacc.) Traverso (1906) = Diaporthe semiimmersa
- P. seposita (Sacc.) Traverso (1906) = Diaporthe seposita
- P. sojae Lehman (1922) = Diaporthe phaseolorum
- P. sophorae (Sacc.) Traverso (1906) = Diaporthe sophorae
- P. sordidula Traverso (1906) = Diaporthe carpini
- P. spectabilis V.G. Rao & B.R.D. Yadav (1985) = Diaporthe spectabilis
- P. spiraeina (Sacc. & Briard) Höhn. (1916) = Leptostroma spiraeinum, Rhytismataceae
- P. stictica (Berk. & Broome) Traverso (1906) = Diaporthe stictica
- P. stipata (Lib.) B. Sutton (1967) = Apiognomonia erythrostoma, Gnomoniaceae
- P. striiformis var. hysteriola (Sacc.) Grove (1917) = Phomopsis hysteriola
- P. strobi Syd. (1922) = Allantophomopsiella pseudotsugae, Phacidiaceae
- P. subordinaria (Desm.) Traverso (1906) = Diaporthe subordinaria
- P. syringina (Sacc.) Traverso (1906) = Diaporthe nodosa
- P. systema-solare (Naumov) Gvrit. & Ratiani (1973) = Cytomelanconis systema-solare, Melanconidaceae
- P. tamicola (Cooke) Traverso (1906) = Diaporthe scandens
- P. tanakae Tak. Kobay. & Sakuma (1982) = Diaporthe tanakae
- P. tersa (Sacc.) B. Sutton (1980) = Diaporthe tersa
- P. theae Petch (1925) = Diaporthe theae
- P. tipuanae Punith. (1973) = Phomopsis cancri
- P. tuberivora Güssow & W.R. Foster (1932) = Phacidiopycnis tuberivora Phacidiaceae
- P. tulasnei Sacc. (1906) = Diaporthe tulasnei
- P. vaccinii Shear, N.E. Stevens & H.F. Bain (1931) = Diaporthe vaccinii
- P. velata (Sacc.) Traverso (1906) = Diaporthe eres
- P. vepris (Sacc.) Höhn. (1906) = Anisogramma vepris, Diaporthales
- P. vexans (Sacc. & P. Syd.) Harter (1914) = Diaporthe vexans
- P. viridarii f. nervicola Traverso & Spessa (1910) = Phomopsis viridarii
- P. viticola (Sacc.) Sacc. (1915) = Diaporthe neoviticola
- P. viticola var. ampelopsidis Grove (1919) = Diaporthe neoviticola
- P. vitimegaspora K.C. Kuo & L.S. Leu (1998) = Diaporthe vitimegaspora
- P. westendorpii (Thüm.) Petr. (1925) = Phyllosticta westendorpii, Phyllostictaceae
