= List of asparagus diseases =

This article is a list of diseases of asparagus (Asparagus officinalis).

== Fungal diseases ==
Fungal diseases
Anthracnose	Colletotrichum gloeosporioides Colletotrichum dematium
Ascochyta blight	Ascochyta asparagina
Blue mold rot	Penicillium aurantiogriseum
Cercospora blight	Cercospora asparagi
Dead stem	Fusarium culmorum
Fusarium crown and root rot	Fusarium oxysporum f.sp. asparagi Fusarium redolens Gibberella fujikuroi (mating population A); Fusarium verticillioides [anamorph] Gibberella fujikuroi (mating population D); Fusarium proliferatum [anamorph]
Fusarium spear spot	Fusarium oxysporum f.sp. asparagi Fusarium redolens
Gray mold shoot blight	Botrytis cinerea
Leaf spot	Alternaria alternata
Phomopsis blight	Phomopsis asparagi Phomopsis asparagicola Phomopsis javanica
Phytophthora spear and crown rot	Phytophthora megasperma
Purple spot	Pleospora herbarum Stemphylium vesicarium [anamorph]
Rhizoctonia crown rot	Rhizoctonia solani Rhizoctonia sp.
Rust	Puccinia asparagi
Watery soft rot	Sclerotinia sclerotiorum
Zopfia root rot	Zopfia rhizophila

== Viral and viroid diseases ==
Viral and viroid diseases
Asparagus decline	genus Potyvirus, Asparagus 1 virus (AV-1) genus Ilarvirus, Asparagus 2 virus (AV-2)
Asparagus mosaic	genus Potexvirus, Asparagus 3 virus (AV-3) genus Ilarvirus, Tobacco streak virus (TSV)

== Miscellaneous diseases and disorders ==
Miscellaneous diseases and disorders
Fasciation	Abiotic
