= List of sweet potato diseases =

This article is a list of diseases of the sweet potato (Ipomoea batatas).

== Bacterial diseases ==
Bacterial diseases
Bacterial leaf spot	Xanthomonas campestris (Pammel) Dowson
Bacterial stem and root rot	Erwinia chrysanthemi
Bacterial wilt	Ralstonia solanacearum
Crown gall	Agrobacterium tumefaciens
Hairy roots	Agrobacterium rhizogenes
Little leaf (proliferation disease)	Phytoplasma

== Fungal diseases ==
Fungal diseases
Alternaria leaf spot and stem blight	Alternaria spp.
Alternaria storage rot	Alternaria spp.
Black rot	Ceratocystis fimbriata Chalara sp. [anamorph]
Blue mold rot	Penicillium spp.
Cercospora leaf spot	Cercospora spp. Phaeoisariopsis bataticola = Cercospora bataticola, C. batatas, C. ipomoeae
Charcoal rot	Macrophomina phaseolina
Chlorotic leaf distortion	Fusarium lateritium Gibberella baccata [teleomorph]
Circular spot	Sclerotium rolfsii Athelia rolfsii [teleomorph]
Dry rot	Diaporthe phaseolorum = Diaporthe batatatis Phomopsis phaseoli [anamorph]
End rot	Fusarium spp. Fusarium solani Nectria haematococca [teleomorph]
Foot rot	Plenodomus destruens
Fusarium root rot and stem canker	Fusarium solani
Fusarium wilt (stem rot)	Fusarium oxysporum f.sp. batatas
Gray mold rot	Botrytis cinerea Botryotinia fuckeliana [teleomorph]
Java black rot	Lasiodiplodia theobromae = Diplodia gossypina
Leaf mold	Choanephora cucurbitarum
Mottle necrosis	Pythium spp. Pythium scleroteichum Pythium ultimum Phytophthora spp.
Phyllosticta leaf blight	Phomopsis ipomeae-batatas = Phyllosticta batatas
Phymatotrichum root rot (cotton root rot)	Phymatotrichopsis omnivora = Phymatotrichum omnivorum
Pink root	Phoma terrestris = Pyrenochaeta terrestris
Punky rot	Trichoderma spp. Trichoderma koningii
Rhizoctonia stem canker (sprout rot)	Rhizoctonia solani Thanatephorus cucumeris [teleomorph]
Rhizopus soft rot	Rhizopus spp. Rhizopus stolonifer
Rootlet rot	Fusarium solani Pythium spp. Pythium ultimum Rhizoctonia solani Streptomyces ipomoeae
Rust, red	Coleosporium ipomoeae
Rust, white	Albugo ipomoeae-panduratae
Scab, leaf and stem	Sphaceloma batatas Elsinoe batatas [teleomorph]
Southern blight Sclerotial blight	Sclerotium rolfsii
Scurf	Monilochaetes infuscans
Septoria leaf spot	Septoria bataticola
Storage rot	Epicoccum spp. Fusarium solani Mucor racemosus Sclerotinia spp.
Surface rot	Fusarium oxysporum Fusarium solani
Violet root rot	Helicobasidium mompa

== Nematodes, parasitic ==
Nematodes, parasitic
Brown ring of roots (bulb and stem nematode)	Ditylenchus dipsaci Ditylenchus destructor
Burrowing	Radopholus similis
Dagger	Xiphinema spp. Xiphinema americanum
Lesion	Pratylenchus brachyurus Pratylenchus coffeae
Pin	Paratylenchus spp.
Reniform	Rotylenchulus reniformis
Root-knot	Meloidogyne spp. Meloidogyne arenaria Meloidogyne hapla Meloidogyne incognita Meloidogyne javanica
Spiral	Helicotylenchus spp.
Sting	Belonolaimus longicaudatus
Stubby-root	Paratrichodorus spp. Paratrichodorus minor
Stunt	Tylenchorhynchus spp.

== Viral and viroid diseases ==
Viral and viroid diseases
Feathery mottle	Sweet potato feathery mottle virus (SPFMV)
Internal cork	Internal cork strain of Sweet potato feathery mottle virus (SPFMV-IC)
Latent virus	Sweet potato latent virus (SPLV)
Mild mottle	Sweet potato mild mottle virus (SPMMV)
Russet crack	Russet crack strain of Sweet potato feathery mottle virus (SPFMV-RC)
Sweet potato virus disease (SPVD)	Sweet potato feathery mottle virus and Sweet potato chlorotic stunt virus
