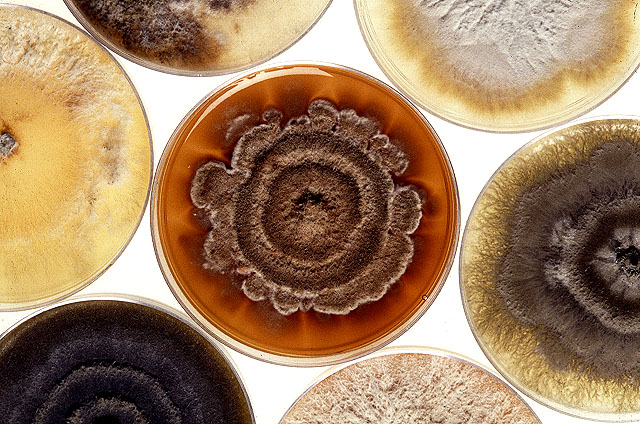
- Cultures of the destructive mold called Phomopsis

Scientific classification
- Kingdom: Fungi
- Division: Ascomycota
- Class: Sordariomycetes
- Order: Diaporthales
- Family: Valsaceae
- Genus: Phomopsis; Sacc. & Roum.

Species
- Phomopsis abdita; Phomopsis amaranthicola; Phomopsis asparagi; Phomopsis averrhoae; Phomopsis azadirachtae; Phomopsis bougainvilleicola; Phomopsis camptothecae; Phomopsis capsici; Phomopsis castaneae; Phomopsis chimonanthi; Phomopsis columnaris; Phomopsis conorum; Phomopsis cycadis; Phomopsis dauci; Phomopsis destruens; Phomopsis diachenii; Phomopsis durionis Syd. 1932; Phomopsis emicis; Phomopsis eucommicola; Phomopsis eucommii; Phomopsis euphorbiae; Phomopsis foeniculi; Phomopsis fukushii; Phomopsis fusiformis; Phomopsis glabrae; Phomopsis heveicola; Phomopsis ipomoeae-batatas; Phomopsis juglandina; Phomopsis juniperivora; Phomopsis lactucae; Phomopsis lagerstroemiae; Phomopsis leptostromiformis; Phomopsis limonii; Phomopsis longanae; Phomopsis loropetali; Phomopsis magnoliae; Phomopsis mali; Phomopsis malvacearum; Phomopsis mangiferae; Phomopsis micheliae; Phomopsis obscurans; Phomopsis occulta; Phomopsis oryzae; Phomopsis oxalina; Phomopsis palmicola; Phomopsis phaseoli; Phomopsis phyllanthicola; Phomopsis prunorum; Phomopsis quercella; Phomopsis quercina; Phomopsis rhois; Phomopsis stipata; Phomopsis tersa; Phomopsis theae; Phomopsis tuberivora; Phomopsis velata; Phomopsis vexans

= Phomopsis =

Genus of fungi

Phomopsis is a genus of ascomycete fungi in the family Diaporthaceae. It was previously in the Valsaceae family.

== Species ==
680 records are listed by Species Fungorum;

See List of Phomopsis species (for full list of species).

Selected species list includes;

- Phomopsis arnoldiae
- Phomopsis asparagi
- Phomopsis asparagicola
- Phomopsis azadirachtae
- Phomopsis cannabina
- Phomopsis caricae-papayae
- Phomopsis coffeae
- Phomopsis durionis Syd. 1932
- Phomopsis elaeagni
- Phomopsis ganjae
- Phomopsis javanica
- Phomopsis juniperovora
- Phomopsis lokoyae
- Phomopsis longicolla
- Phomopsis mangiferae
- Phomopsis obscurans
- Phomopsis perseae
- Phomopsis pittospori
- Phomopsis prunorum
- Phomopsis sojae
- Phomopsis scabra
- Phomopsis sclerotioides
- Phomopsis tanakae
- Phomopsis theae
- Phomopsis viticola

Formerly placed here:

- Phomopsis vaccinii, now Diaporthe vaccinii
- Phomopsis leptostromiformis, now Diaporthe toxica

== Dead-arm infection ==
One of the species of this genus, P. viticola, cause a grape disease called Phomopsis or dead-arm. Usually, infections begin during early growth stages in spring. This affects leaves, fruit, rachises, and shoots of a plant.

This disease causes the formation of lesions on shoots, leaves, and rachises, but also can cause fruit rot.

It causes significant economic damage to grape vines.

Another Phomopsis species, P. juniperovora, infects junipers, and is a particularly important pest of seedlings and juvenile plants in the nursery industry.

== See also ==
- List of soybean diseases
