= Forest dieback =

Stand of trees losing health and dying

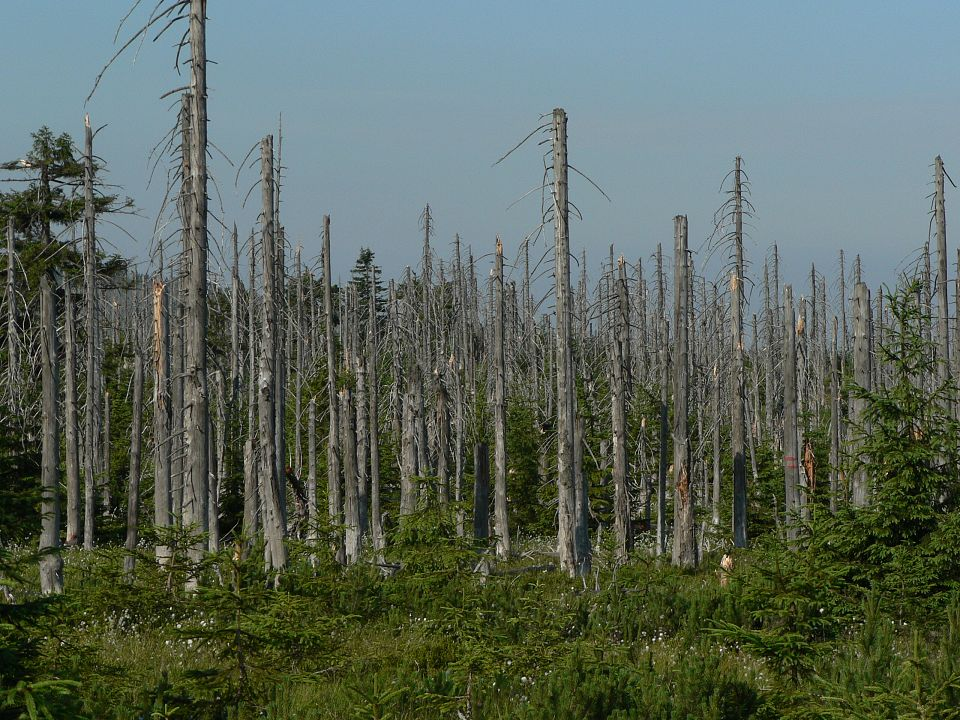
Jizera Mountains in Central Europe in 2006

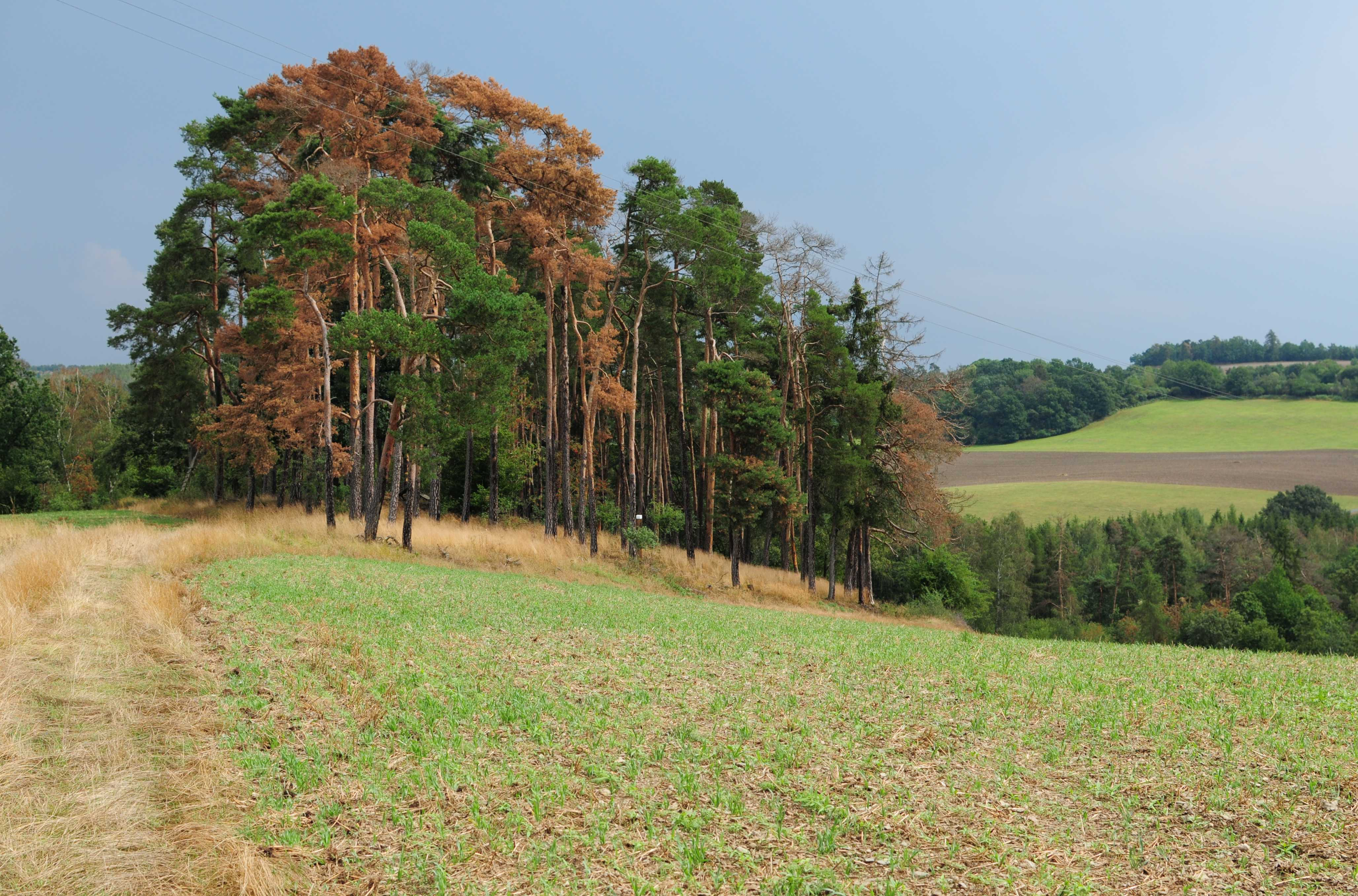
Tree dieback because of persistent drought in the Saxonian Vogtland in 2020

Forest dieback (also "Waldsterben", a German loan word, pronounced [ˈvaltˌʃtɛʁbn̩]) is a condition in trees or woody plants in which peripheral parts are killed, either by pathogens, parasites or conditions like acid rain, drought, and more.

These episodes can have disastrous consequences such as reduced resiliency of the ecosystem, disappearing important symbiotic relationships and thresholds. Some tipping points for major climate change forecast in the next century are directly related to forest diebacks.

== Definition ==
Forest dieback refers to the phenomenon of a stand of trees losing health and dying without an obvious cause. This condition is also known as forest decline, forest damage, canopy level dieback, and stand level dieback. This usually affects individual species of trees, but can also affect multiple species. Dieback is an episodic event and may take on many locations and shapes. It can be along the perimeter, at specific elevations, or dispersed throughout the forest ecosystem.

Forest dieback presents itself in many ways: falling off of leaves and needles, discolouration of leaves and needles, thinning of the crowns of trees, dead stands of trees of a certain age, and changes in the roots of the trees. It also has many dynamic forms. A stand of trees can exhibit mild symptoms, extreme symptoms, or even death. Forest decline can be viewed as the result of continued, widespread, and severe dieback of multiple species in a forest. Current forest decline can be defined by: rapid development on individual trees, occurrence in different forest types, occurrence over a long duration (over 10 years), and occurrence throughout the natural range of affected species.

== History ==
A lot of research was done in the 1980s when a severe dieback occurred in Germany and the Northeast United States. Previous diebacks were regionally limited, however, starting at the end of the 1970s, a decline took over the forests in Central Europe and parts of North America. The forest damage in Germany, specifically, was different as the decline was severe: the damage was widespread across various tree species. The percentage of affected trees increased from 8% in 1982 to 50% in 1984 and stayed at 50% through 1987. Many hypotheses have been proposed for this dieback, see below.

In the 20th century, North America was hit with five notable hardwood diebacks. They occurred following the maturation of the forest and each episode had lasted about eleven years. The most severe temperate forest dieback targeted white birch and yellow birch trees. They experienced an episode that started between 1934 and 1937 and ended between 1953 and 1954. This followed a wave pattern that first appeared in Southern regions and moved to Northern regions, where a second wave was evident between 1957 and 1965 in Northern Quebec.

Dieback can also affect other species such as ash, oak, and maple. Sugar maple, particularly, experienced a wave of dieback in parts of the United States during the 1960s. A second wave occurred primarily in Canada in the 1980s, but also managed to reach the United States. These diebacks were numerically analyzed to exclude natural tree mortality. It is hypothesized that a mature forest is more susceptible to extreme environmental stresses.

== Potential causes of forest dieback ==
The components of a forest ecosystem are complex and identifying specific cause–effect relationships between dieback and the environment is a difficult process. Over the years, a lot of research has been conducted and some hypotheses have been agreed upon such as:

- Bark beetle: Bark beetles use the soft tissues of a tree for shelter, subsistence and nesting. Their arrival usually also includes other organisms such as fungi and bacteria. Together, they form symbiotic relationships where the condition of the tree gets exacerbated. Their life cycle is dependent on the presence of a tree as they lay their eggs in them. Once hatched, the larva can form a parasitic relationship with the tree, where it lives off it and cuts the circulation of water and nutrients from the roots to the shoots.
- Groundwater conditions: A study conducted in Australia found that conditions such as depth and salinity could potentially help predict diebacks before they occur. In one bioregion, when both depth and salinity concentrations increased, standing of forests increased. However, in another bioregion in the same study area, when depth increased but the water had lower concentrations of salts (i.e. freshwater), diebacks increased.
- Drought and heat stress: Drought and heat stress are hypothesized to cause dieback. Their apparent reason comes from two mechanisms. The first one, hydraulic failure, results in transportation failure of water from the roots to the shoots of a tree. This can cause dehydration and possibly death. The second, carbon starvation, occurs as a plant's response to heat is to close its stomata. This phenomenon cuts off entry of carbon dioxide, thereby making the plant rely on stored compounds like sugar. If the heat event is long and if the plant runs out of sugar, it will starve and die.
- Pathogens are responsible for many diebacks. It is difficult to isolate and identify exactly which pathogens are responsible and how they interact with the trees. For instance Phomopsis azadirachtae is a fungus of the genus Phomopsis that has been identified as responsible for the dieback in Azadirachta indica (Neem) in the regions of India. Some experts consider dieback as a group of diseases with incompletely understood origins influenced by factors which predispose trees under stress to invasion.

Some other hypotheses could explain the causes and effects of dieback. As agreed upon between the scientific exchanges of Germany and the United States in 1988:

- Soil acidification/aluminum toxicity: As a soil becomes more acidic, aluminum gets released, damaging the tree's roots. Some of the observed effects are: a reduction of uptake and transport of some cations, reduction in root respiration, damage to fine feeder roots and root morphology, and reduction in elasticity of the cell walls. This was proposed by Professor Bernhard Ulrich in 1979.
- Complex High-Elevation Disease: The combination of high ozone levels, acid deposition and nutrient deficiencies at high elevations kills trees. High ozone concentrations damage the leaves and needles of trees and nutrients get leached from the foliage. The chain of events gets magnified over time. This was proposed by a group of professors: Bernhard Prinz, Karl Rehfuess, and Heinz Zöttl.
- Red-needle disease of spruce: This disease causes needle drop and crown thinning. Needles turn a rust color and fall off. This is caused by foliar fungi, which are secondary parasites attacking already weakened trees. This was proposed by Professor Karl Rehfuess.
- Pollution: The increased concentration level of atmospheric pollutants hurts the root system and leads to the accumulation of toxins in new leaves. Pollutants can alter the growth, reduce the photosynthetic activity, and reduce the formation of secondary metabolites. It is believed that low concentrations levels can be considered toxic. This was proposed by a group of professors led by Peter Schütt.
  - Organic Air Pollutants: this subsection focuses on organic compounds. The three compounds seriously discussed are ethylene, aniline, and dinitrophenol. Even at low levels, these organic chemical compounds have caused: abnormal dropping of foliage, twisted foliage, and killing of seedlings. This was proposed by Fritz Führ.
- Excess Nitrogen Deposition: The increased level of nitrogen and ammonium, both commonly found in fertilizer, could have the following possible effects: it could inhibit beneficial fungi, delay chemical reactions, disturb normal balances between shoot growth and root growth, and increase soil leaching. However, there is no experimental proof. This was proposed by Carl Olaf Tamm. See also: Nutrient pollution

== Consequences of forest dieback ==
Forest dieback can be caused by a multitude of factors, however, once they occur, they can have certain consequences.

- Fungal community: Ectomycorrhizal fungi form a symbiotic relationship with trees. Following a bark beetle outbreak, dieback can occur. This process can decrease photosynthesis, nutrient availability and decomposition rates and processes. Once this occurs, the symbiotic relationship, previously mentioned, gets negatively affected: the ectomycorrhizal fungi community decreases and then the relationship disappears altogether. This is problematic as certain plants depend on their presence for survival.
- Soil chemistry: Soil chemistry can change following a dieback episode. It can result in the increase of base saturation as biomass left behind set free certain ions such as calcium, magnesium and potassium. This can be considered a positive consequence as base saturation is essential for plant growth and soil fertility. Therefore, this signifies that soil chemistry following a dieback even could aid in recovering acidic soils.

=== Climate change ===
Globally, wildfires and deforestation have reduced forests' net absorption of greenhouse gases, reducing their effectiveness at mitigating climate change. Global warming increases forest fires that release more greenhouse gases, creating a feedback loop that causes more warming.

Changes in mean annual temperature and drought are major contributing factors to forest dieback. As more carbon is released from dead trees, especially in the Amazon and Boreal forests, more greenhouse gases are released into the atmosphere. Increased levels of greenhouse gases increase the temperature of the atmosphere. Projections for dieback vary, but the threat of global climate change only stands to increase the rate of dieback.

- Reduced resiliency: Trees can be resilient. However, that can be changed when the ecosystem is hit with a drought episode. This results in trees becoming more susceptible to insect infestations, thereby triggering a dieback event. This is a problem as climate change is predicted to increase drought in certain regions of the world.
- Thresholds: A number of thresholds exist in relation to forest dieback such as "biodiversity ..., ecological condition ... and ecosystem function". As climate change has the power to cause diebacks through multiple processes, these thresholds are becoming more and more achievable where, in some cases, they have the ability to induce a positive feedback process: when the basal area in an ecosystem decreases by 50%, species richness of ectomycorrhizal fungi follows. As mentioned earlier, ectomycorrhizal fungi are important for the survival of certain plants, turning dieback into a positive feedback mechanism.
- Tipping points: Scientists do not know the exact tipping points of climate change and can only estimate the timescales. When a tipping point is reached, a small change in human activity can have long-term consequences on the environment. Two of the nine tipping points for major climate changes forecast for the next century are directly related to forest diebacks. Scientists are worried that forest dieback in the Amazon rainforest and the Boreal evergreen forest will trigger a tipping point in the next 50 years.

== See also ==
- Bark beetle
- Birch dieback
- Forest pathology
- Heat wave
- Hymenoscyphus fraxineus – cause of ash dieback
- Kauri dieback
- Permanent wilting point
