= Phomopsis theae =

Scientific classification
- Kingdom: Fungi
- Division: Ascomycota
- Class: Sordariomycetes
- Order: Diaporthales
- Family: Valsaceae
- Genus: Phomopsis
- Species: P. theae

Binomial name
- Phomopsis theae Petch (1925)

Synonyms
- Leptothyrium theae Petch (1925)

Species of fungus

Phomopsis theae is a fungal plant pathogen infecting tea.
