= Phomopsis caricae-papayae =

Scientific classification
- Kingdom: Fungi
- Division: Ascomycota
- Class: Sordariomycetes
- Order: Diaporthales
- Family: Valsaceae
- Genus: Phomopsis
- Species: P. caricae-papayae

Binomial name
- Phomopsis caricae-papayae Petr. & Cif. (1930)

Species of fungus

Phomopsis caricae-papayae is a fungal plant pathogen infecting papayas.
