= Phomopsis sclerotioides =

Scientific classification
- Kingdom: Fungi
- Division: Ascomycota
- Class: Sordariomycetes
- Order: Diaporthales
- Family: Valsaceae
- Genus: Phomopsis
- Species: P. sclerotioides

Binomial name
- Phomopsis sclerotioides Kesteren (1967)

Species of fungus

Phomopsis sclerotioides is a fungal plant pathogen infecting cucurbits.
