= Phomopsis tanakae =

Scientific classification
- Kingdom: Fungi
- Division: Ascomycota
- Class: Sordariomycetes
- Order: Diaporthales
- Family: Valsaceae
- Genus: Phomopsis
- Species: P. tanakae

Binomial name
- Phomopsis tanakae Ts. Kobay. & Sakuma, (1982)

Synonyms
- Diaporthe tanakae Ts. Kobay. & Sakuma 1982

Species of fungus

Phomopsis tanakae is a fungal plant pathogen infecting apples.
