= Phomopsis scabra =

Scientific classification
- Kingdom: Fungi
- Division: Ascomycota
- Class: Sordariomycetes
- Order: Diaporthales
- Family: Valsaceae
- Genus: Phomopsis
- Species: P. scabra

Binomial name
- Phomopsis scabra (Sacc.) Traverso (1906)

Species of fungus

Phomopsis scabra is a fungal plant pathogen infecting plane trees.
