= Phomopsis obscurans =

- V-shaped lesion on a strawberry leaf

Scientific classification
- Kingdom: Fungi
- Division: Ascomycota
- Class: Sordariomycetes
- Order: Diaporthales
- Family: Valsaceae
- Genus: Phomopsis
- Species: P. obscurans

Binomial name
- Phomopsis obscurans (Ellis & Everh.) B. Sutton, (1965)

Synonyms
- Dendrophoma obscurans (Ellis & Everh.) H.W. Anderson, (1920); Phoma obscurans Ellis & Everh., (1894); Phyllosticta obscurans (Ellis & Everh.) Tassi, (1902); Sphaeropsis obscurans (Ellis & Everh.) Kuntze, (1898)

Species of fungus

Phomopsis obscurans is a common fungus found in strawberry plants, which causes the disease of leaf blight. Common symptoms caused by the pathogen begin as small circular reddish-purple spots and enlarge to form V-shaped lesions that follow the vasculature of the plant's leaves. Although the fungus infects leaves early in the growing season when the plants are beginning to develop, leaf blight symptoms are most apparent on older plants towards the end of the growing season. The disease can weaken strawberry plants through the destruction of foliage, which results in reduced yields. In years highly favorable for disease development, leaf blight can ultimately lead to the death of the strawberry plants. A favorable environment for the growth and development of the Phomopsis obscurans pathogen is that of high temperature, high inoculum density, a long period of exposure to moisture, and immature host tissue. In the case of disease management, a conjunction of cultural practices is the most effective way of reducing the infection.

== Host and symptoms ==
Phomopsis obscurans is the specific pathogen that is known to cause leaf blight of strawberries, and is among the list of most commonly found diseases caused by Phomopsis.

The symptoms of leaf blight infections begin as one to several circular reddish-purple spots, 3/8” to 1/2” in diameter on a leaflet and enlarge to form V-shaped lesions with a dark brown inner zone, a light brown outer zone, and a purple, red, or yellow perimeter. Lesions follow major veins progressing inward, which is what gives rise to the characteristic V-shaped lesions that result after the pathogen has established a strong infection in the plant tissue. The whole leaflet may turn yellow and then brown due to infection and subsequent necrosis of the plant tissue. In severe cases where the pathogen has progressed substantially, the stolons, fruit, and petioles of the leaf become infected and may girdle and kill the stem. The disease is commonly found in young tissue of the strawberry plant, when defense mechanisms may not yet be fully established.

In later stages of development, when the fruit is infected and begins to rot, the disease resembles that of Anthracnose fruit rot. However, the diseases can be quickly differentiated by their differing signs because the lesions of Anthracnose fruit rot do not develop the tell-tale pycnidia fruiting bodies found in Phomopsis.

== Environment ==
Temperature, inoculum density, moisture period, and host tissue maturity all have an effect on the disease development of the inoculated strawberry plant. Temperature takes a vital role in the infection and development of the blight disease caused by the pathogen, Phomopsis obscurans. The most ideal temperature that leads to the greatest amount of disease growth, conidial germination, and germ tube elongation is between 26 and 32 °C (79 and 90 °F). Within this temperature range, inoculated plants experienced the greatest symptom development and the most severe infection at 30 °C (86 °F). These temperatures are commonly found in the midsummer environment of North Carolina, where leaf blight of strawberries caused by Phomopsis obscurans is especially prevalent.

Inoculum density also has an effect on the development of the disease on host tissue. Inoculated conidial concentration is directly correlated with disease severity, thus, with increasing concentrations of conidia present on the host tissue, the severity of the disease also increases. The optimum disease severity was achieved with a concentration of 1 × 10^{7} conidia per millimeter.

Similarly, duration of exposure to a moist environment also has an effect on disease severity. With the increase in time that inoculated plants were kept in a saturated moist environment, the disease severity also increased in a linear relationship. Ideal moisture exposure is 72 hours, which suggests that it takes the pathogen that long to establish optimal inoculation of the host tissue. There are no insect vectors that were found to specifically influence the spread of this pathogen.

The age at which the host tissue is infected has an influence on the sustainability of the disease and subsequently its overall severity. Young strawberry plants, around 25–30 days of age, have the highest susceptibility to the Phomopsis obscurans pathogen. Characteristics of young plant tissue, such as under-developed cuticles and cell walls, make the tissue highly susceptible to easy penetration of the pathogen and thus, more rapid colonization of the pathogen in the host tissue.
