= Phomopsis ganjae =

Scientific classification
- Kingdom: Fungi
- Division: Ascomycota
- Class: Sordariomycetes
- Order: Diaporthales
- Family: Valsaceae
- Genus: Phomopsis
- Species: P. ganjae

Binomial name
- Phomopsis ganjae McPartl. (1983)

Species of fungus

Phomopsis ganjae is a fungal plant pathogen infecting hemp.
