= Phomopsis blight of juniper =

Species of fungus

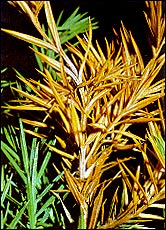
- A juniper tree infected with Phomopsis juniperova
- Common names: Tip Blight of Juniper
- Causal agents: Phomopsis juniperovora
- Hosts: eastern red cedar, savin (Juniperus sabina), creeping juniper, rocky mountain juniper (Juniperus scopulorum), Chinese juniper and common juniper

Phomopsis blight of juniper

Scientific classification
- Kingdom: Fungi
- Division: Ascomycota
- Class: Sordariomycetes
- Order: Diaporthales
- Family: Valsaceae
- Genus: Phomopsis
- Species: P. juniperovora

Binomial name
- Phomopsis juniperovora G.G.Hahn

Phomopsis blight of juniper is a foliar disease discovered in 1917 caused by the fungal pathogen Phomopsis juniperovora. The fungus infects new growth of juniper trees or shrubs, i.e. the seedlings or young shoots of mature trees. Infection begins with the germination of asexual conidia, borne from pycnidia, on susceptible tissue, the mycelia gradually move inwards down the branch, and into the main stem. Management strategies mainly include removing and destroying diseased tissue and limiting the presence of moisture on plants. Junipers become resistant to infection as they mature and the young yellow shoots turn dark green. Preventive strategies include planting only resistant varieties and spraying new growth with fungicide until plants have matured.

== Hosts and symptoms ==
Phomopsis blight of juniper commonly infects the eastern red cedar, savin (Juniperus sabina), creeping juniper, and rocky mountain juniper plants (Juniperus scopulorum), but also has the ability to infect Chinese juniper and common juniper to varying degrees.

Although spores from diseased juniper plants infect healthy hosts in the fall, symptoms are usually not seen until late winter or early spring. Often the first symptom noted is the browning of needle tips as the disease invades young, vulnerable tissue. New shoots that are normally yellow-green in color begin to turn to red brown and then ashen gray as they slowly die from the fungal disease. The infection progresses inward from the tips of branches and forms small lesions at points where infected tissue meets healthy tissue. Lesions then girdle limbs less than one centimeter in diameter, effectively killing the entire branch. Repeated blighting occurring in early summer may also result in abnormal bunching caused by Moniliophthora perniciosa or more commonly known as Witches Broom.

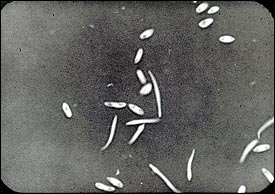
Alpha spores are spherically shaped while beta spores are long and filamentous

Phomopsis blight of juniper only infects young, succulent tissue such as immature leaves or branches. Junipers that have been wounded or freshly pruned junipers also yield higher infection rates due to an increase of new growth. Mature juniper plants lack these characteristics and are usually immune to infection. On average, their branches also have larger diameters, which allow lesions to heal rather than become girdled and kill the terminal branch.

=== Diagnosis ===
Due to commonalities in symptoms of P. juniperova and related Phomopsis blights, diagnosis can often be difficult. Although the observation of symptoms is the first step in identification of this pathogen, the presence of both alpha and beta spores in the pycnidium must be verified in order to confirm the existence of P. juniperova. Alpha spores are spherical spores active in host infection while beta spores, are long, narrow, stylospores, which do not play a part in disease contagion. Beta spores are rarely found in the wild, but proliferate when P. juniperova is grown on cultures of potato dextrose agar. If the resources for this method of diagnosis are not available, contact a local extension office to be directed to an expert in plant pathogens or a laboratory that can assist with the process.

== Disease cycle ==
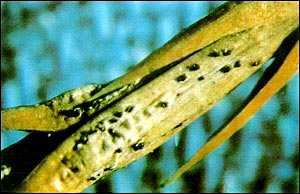
Pycnidia fruiting bodies can be seen on lesions of a juniper that has been infected by Phomopsis juniperovora

Phomopsis juniperovora reproduces by conidia (asexual spores), which are produced in survival structures called pycnidia. During wet, rainy periods, the conidia are released from the pycnidia and spread to uninfected tissue via rain splash. Spores then germinate, infecting immature scales (minute needles) of trees or shrubs in the cypress family (Cupressaceae); the pathogen does not infect healthy, mature twigs. Within 3 weeks of infection P. juniperovora can produce viable spores for reinfection, however, pycnidia formation is most common on dying shoots. The fungus is capable of forming pycnidia in dry shoots for up to two years after the tissue has died off. As long as the environmental conditions are right, secondary inoculum will continue to be produced. At the end of the prime growing season, new spores (contained in pycnidia) overwinter on dead, dry tissue until conditions improve, in which the reproductive cycle starts up again.

There are two spore types produced by this pathogen, an alpha-spore and beta-spore. The alpha-spore is viable and can germinate, but the beta-spore is not viable and will not germinate.

== Environment ==
Phomopsis blight of juniper is most aggressive during cool, moist weather often associated with spring. These conditions promote pycnidia to release their spores, which possess an optimal germination temperature range between 24 and 28 degrees Celsius. Continuously wet foliage is needed for infection to occur. Areas with heavy shade and poor drainage allow for moist, slow drying areas for the disease to thrive in. Exposure to 100 percent humidity for as little as 7 hours can propagate seedlings to be fully infected.

== Management ==
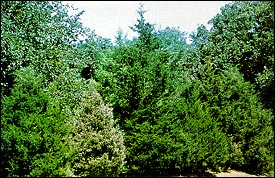
A resistant juniper tree surrounded by junipers infected with Phomopsis juniperova

Planting only resistant varieties of juniper is the most efficient method of preventing Phomopsis blight. For information on resistant cultivars contact a local extension office. If blight is already established in a population, then the most effective management strategies include sanitation and chemical application to prevent further infection. The infectious spores are transported to new host tissue via wind, water, insects, human handling, and equipment. Therefore, careful preventive measures, sanitation methods, and management strategies are required to restrict the movement of disease from host to host.

=== Preventive measures ===
Some precautionary measures include integrating only healthy juniper seedlings into a new or existing population. Avoid plants with yellow or grey discoloration on the needles or black or grey necrotic areas on the branches and stems. Furthermore, avoid planting in poorly drained or heavily shaded areas as prolonged moisture or wetness will promote disease development. Proper spacing when planting will allow air movement to keep foliage relatively dry and limit germination of the fungus. In general, junipers should be spaced 3–5 ft apart in hedges or landscaping, 5–7 ft for shrub rows, and 8–10 ft apart for tree hedges, windbreaks, or reforestation. Rows should be planted 12–20 feet apart depending on the variety.

Inadvertently wounding plant tissue should be avoided as much as possible and wounded plant tissue, i.e. juniper mulch or infected seedlings, should not be introduced to the nursery. If overhead irrigation is utilized, then watering should occur in the morning or early afternoon so that the plants will be dry before evening. Nurseries should not use shading frames which lengthen the time moisture is present on the plants. Additionally, new seedlings should not be planted near susceptible hosts and susceptible hosts should not be planted around nurseries because they will promote the spread of disease.

=== Sanitation practices ===
Pruning back the blighted areas at least 3 inches below the infected shoot and removing infected seedlings will prevent the movement of the fungus into the host or to another host. Shears should be disinfected between each cut with alcohol or bleach solution. All diseased plant waste should be disposed of either by burning or sealed in plastic bags and taken to a sanitary landfill. Pruning should take place only during dry weather as wet plants should not be pruned or handled. If possible, plan pruning so new growth will occur during drier parts of the year, late June to early August. Additionally, juniper nurseries should prune trees every 7–10 days in dry weather.

=== Management strategies: chemical application ===
Phomopsis blight of juniper can be prevented via foliar fungicide applications. New growth, i.e. seedlings or new shoots, should be sprayed every 7–10 days in a nursery or every 10–14 days in landscaping. Sprays should continue until new growth has matured from susceptible yellow color to resistant dark green color. Seasonal new growth should mature by early to mid-summer, however, pruning and wet periods of weather will stimulate new growth which should be sprayed at appropriate intervals until mature. Fungicides should always be applied after new shoot growth and before disease symptoms.

Fungicide applications are not always suitable for large stands of juniper trees. When practical, however, foliar chemical applications can significantly reduce the amount of disease on juniper plants. A variety of broad-spectrum fungicides may be used to control Phomopsis blight on juniper. Typically fungicides marketed to combat leaf, tip, and flower blight on ornamentals will effectively manage disease development by inhibiting fungal growth and development. Fungicides with active ingredients such as propiconazole or mancozeb, a combination of zinc, manganese, and ethylene bisdithiocarbamate, should help prevent disease development. Information about appropriate fungicides specific to a particular area can be found at a local extension office.

== Importance ==
All juniper species are considered valuable in horticulture due to their aesthetically pleasing appearance and general resistance to disease as well as using the heart wood for goods such as fence posts and other landscaping products. Juniper cones (a.k.a. juniper berries) from Juniperus communis are also important in the production of gin, along with being used to flavor foods, sauces, and preserve food.

Phompsis juniperovora, in wet years, is capable of killing off all seedlings. In the late 1940s a major disease outbreak happened, wiping out many immature juniper trees used for windbreaks in the U.S. In addition to killing off young plants, the value of older plants decreases due to infection. This is due to the decrease in aesthetic appeal, and the infection can increase the likelihood of the plant not surviving transplanting or taking longer to establish. An assessment of the economic losses from this disease has not been conducted.
