= Penicillium aurantiogriseum =

Scientific classification
- Domain: Eukaryota
- Kingdom: Fungi
- Division: Ascomycota
- Class: Eurotiomycetes
- Order: Eurotiales
- Family: Aspergillaceae
- Genus: Penicillium
- Species: P. aurantiogriseum

Binomial name
- Penicillium aurantiogriseum Dierckx, (1901)

Synonyms
- Penicillium aurantiocandidum Dierckx & Biourge, (1901); Penicillium aurantiovirens Biourge, (1923); Penicillium brunneoviolaceum Biourge, (1923); Penicillium cyclopium Westling, (1911); Penicillium cyclopium var. aurantiovirens (Biourge) Fassat., (1976); Penicillium johanniolii K.M. Zalessky, (1927); Penicillium lanosocoeruleum Thom, (1930); Penicillium martensii Biourge, (1923); Penicillium puberulum Bainier, (1907); Penicillium verrucosum var. cyclopium (Westling) Samson, Stolk & Hadlok, (1976)

Species of fungus

Penicillium aurantiogriseum is a plant pathogen infecting asparagus and strawberry. Chemical compounds isolated from Penicillium aurantiogriseum include anicequol and auranthine.
