= Phomopsis perseae =

Scientific classification
- Kingdom: Fungi
- Division: Ascomycota
- Class: Sordariomycetes
- Order: Diaporthales
- Family: Valsaceae
- Genus: Phomopsis
- Species: P. perseae

Binomial name
- Phomopsis perseae Zerova, (1940)

Species of fungus

Phomopsis perseae is a fungal plant pathogen affecting avocados.
