= Auranthine =

Names
- IUPAC name 6,7,7a,8-Tetrahydroquinazolino[3’,2’:1,6]pyrido[2,3-b][1,4]benzodiazepine-9,16-dione

Identifiers
CAS Number	107290-05-1
3D model (JSmol)	Interactive image
ChemSpider	115775
PubChem CID	130919
CompTox Dashboard (EPA)	DTXSID10910282
- InChI: InChI=1S/C19H14N4O2/c24-18-11-5-1-3-7-13(11)21-17-15(22-18)9-10-16-20-14-8-4-2-6-12(14)19(25)23(16)17/h1-8,15H,9-10H2,(H,22,24) Key: QSYOIPMDADNFRO-UHFFFAOYSA-N; InChI=1/C19H14N4O2/c24-18-11-5-1-3-7-13(11)21-17-15(22-18)9-10-16-20-14-8-4-2-6-12(14)19(25)23(16)17/h1-8,15H,9-10H2,(H,22,24) Key: QSYOIPMDADNFRO-UHFFFAOYAR
- SMILES: C1CC2=NC3=CC=CC=C3C(=O)N2C4=NC5=CC=CC=C5C(=O)NC41

Properties
Chemical formula	C_{19}H_{14}N_{4}O_{2}
Molar mass	330.347 g·mol^{−1}
- Except where otherwise noted, data are given for materials in their standard state (at 25 °C [77 °F], 100 kPa). Infobox references

Auranthine is an antimicrobial chemical compound isolated from a nephrotoxic strain of Penicillium fungus, Penicillium aurantiogriseum.

A total synthesis of auranthine has been reported.
