= Phomopsis azadirachtae =

Scientific classification
- Kingdom: Fungi
- Division: Ascomycota
- Class: Sordariomycetes
- Order: Diaporthales
- Family: Valsaceae
- Genus: Phomopsis
- Species: P. azadirachtae

Binomial name
- Phomopsis azadirachtae Sateesh, Shank. Bhat & Devaki

Species of fungus

Phomopsis azadirachtae is a fungus, a species of the genus Phomopsis. It has been identified as the fungus responsible for dieback in Azadirachta indica (neem) in India. The species was first identified and described by Sateesh et al in 1997.
