= Phomopsis prunorum =

Scientific classification
- Kingdom: Fungi
- Division: Ascomycota
- Class: Sordariomycetes
- Order: Diaporthales
- Family: Valsaceae
- Genus: Phomopsis
- Species: P. prunorum

Binomial name
- Phomopsis prunorum (Cooke) Grove, (1917)

Synonyms
- Phoma mali Schulzer & Sacc., (1884); Phoma prunorum Cooke, (1885); Phomopsis mali Roberge; Phomopsis mali (Schulzer & Sacc.) Died., (1912)

Species of fungus

Phomopsis prunorum is a plant pathogen infecting apples.
