= Phomopsis elaeagni =

Scientific classification
- Kingdom: Fungi
- Division: Ascomycota
- Class: Sordariomycetes
- Order: Diaporthales
- Family: Valsaceae
- Genus: Phomopsis
- Species: P. elaeagni

Binomial name
- Phomopsis elaeagni Sandu (1962)

Species of fungus

Phomopsis elaeagni is a fungal plant pathogen infecting black walnuts.
