= Phomopsis arnoldiae =

Scientific classification
- Kingdom: Fungi
- Division: Ascomycota
- Class: Sordariomycetes
- Order: Diaporthales
- Family: Valsaceae
- Genus: Phomopsis
- Species: P. arnoldiae

Binomial name
- Phomopsis arnoldiae B.Sutton (1980)

Species of fungus

Phomopsis arnoldiae is a fungal plant pathogen infecting walnuts.
