= Streptomyces ipomoeae =

Scientific classification
- Domain: Bacteria
- Kingdom: Bacillati
- Phylum: Actinomycetota
- Class: Actinomycetes
- Order: Streptomycetales
- Family: Streptomycetaceae
- Genus: Streptomyces
- Species: S. ipomoeae

Binomial name
- Streptomyces ipomoeae (Person and Martin 1940) Waksman and Henrici 1948 (Approved Lists 1980)

Type strain
- ATCC 25462, CBS 695.69, CGMCC 4.1381, CGMCC AS 4.1381, DSM 40383, ICMP 12541, IFO 13050, ISP 5383, KACC 20241, KCC S-0484, Martin 9820, NBRC 13050, NRRL B-12321, NRRL-ISP 5383, RIA 1242, VKM Ac-1734

Synonyms
- "Actinomyces ipomoea" Person and Martin 1940

Species of bacterium

Streptomyces ipomoeae is a bacterium species from the genus of Streptomyces which has been isolated from rot from potatoes. Streptomyces ipomoeae produces thaxtomin C and ipomycin. Streptomyces ipomoeae can cause soft rot disease on sweet potatoes.

== See also ==
- List of Streptomyces species
