= Phomopsis mangiferae =

Scientific classification
- Kingdom: Fungi
- Division: Ascomycota
- Class: Sordariomycetes
- Order: Diaporthales
- Family: Valsaceae
- Genus: Phomopsis
- Species: P. mangiferae

Binomial name
- Phomopsis mangiferae S.Ahmad (1954)

Species of fungus

Phomopsis mangiferae is a plant pathogen infecting mangoes.
