= Phomopsis cannabina =

Scientific classification
- Kingdom: Fungi
- Division: Ascomycota
- Class: Sordariomycetes
- Order: Diaporthales
- Family: Valsaceae
- Genus: Phomopsis
- Species: P. cannabina

Binomial name
- Phomopsis cannabina Curzi (1927)

Species of fungus

Phomopsis cannabina is a plant pathogen infecting hemp.
