= Phomopsis lokoyae =

Scientific classification
- Kingdom: Fungi
- Division: Ascomycota
- Class: Sordariomycetes
- Order: Diaporthales
- Family: Valsaceae
- Genus: Phomopsis
- Species: P. lokoyae

Binomial name
- Phomopsis lokoyae G.G.Hahn (1933)

Species of fungus

Phomopsis lokoyae is a fungal plant pathogen infecting Douglas-firs.
