= Phomopsis coffeae =

Scientific classification
- Kingdom: Fungi
- Division: Ascomycota
- Class: Sordariomycetes
- Order: Diaporthales
- Family: Valsaceae
- Genus: Phomopsis
- Species: P. coffeae

Binomial name
- Phomopsis coffeae Bond.-Mont. (1936)

Species of fungus

Phomopsis coffeae is a plant pathogen infecting coffee.
