= Phomopsis asparagi =

Scientific classification
- Kingdom: Fungi
- Division: Ascomycota
- Class: Sordariomycetes
- Order: Diaporthales
- Family: Valsaceae
- Genus: Phomopsis
- Species: P. asparagi

Binomial name
- Phomopsis asparagi (Sacc.) Grove (1935)

Synonyms
- Phoma asparagi Sacc. (1878)

Species of fungus

Phomopsis asparagi is a fungal plant pathogen that causes phomopsis blight in asparagus.
