= Phomopsis javanica =

Scientific classification
- Kingdom: Fungi
- Division: Ascomycota
- Class: Sordariomycetes
- Order: Diaporthales
- Family: Valsaceae
- Genus: Phomopsis
- Species: P. javanica

Binomial name
- Phomopsis javanica Uecker & D.A.Johnson (1991)

Species of fungus

Phomopsis javanica is a plant pathogen that causes Phomopsis blight in asparagus.
