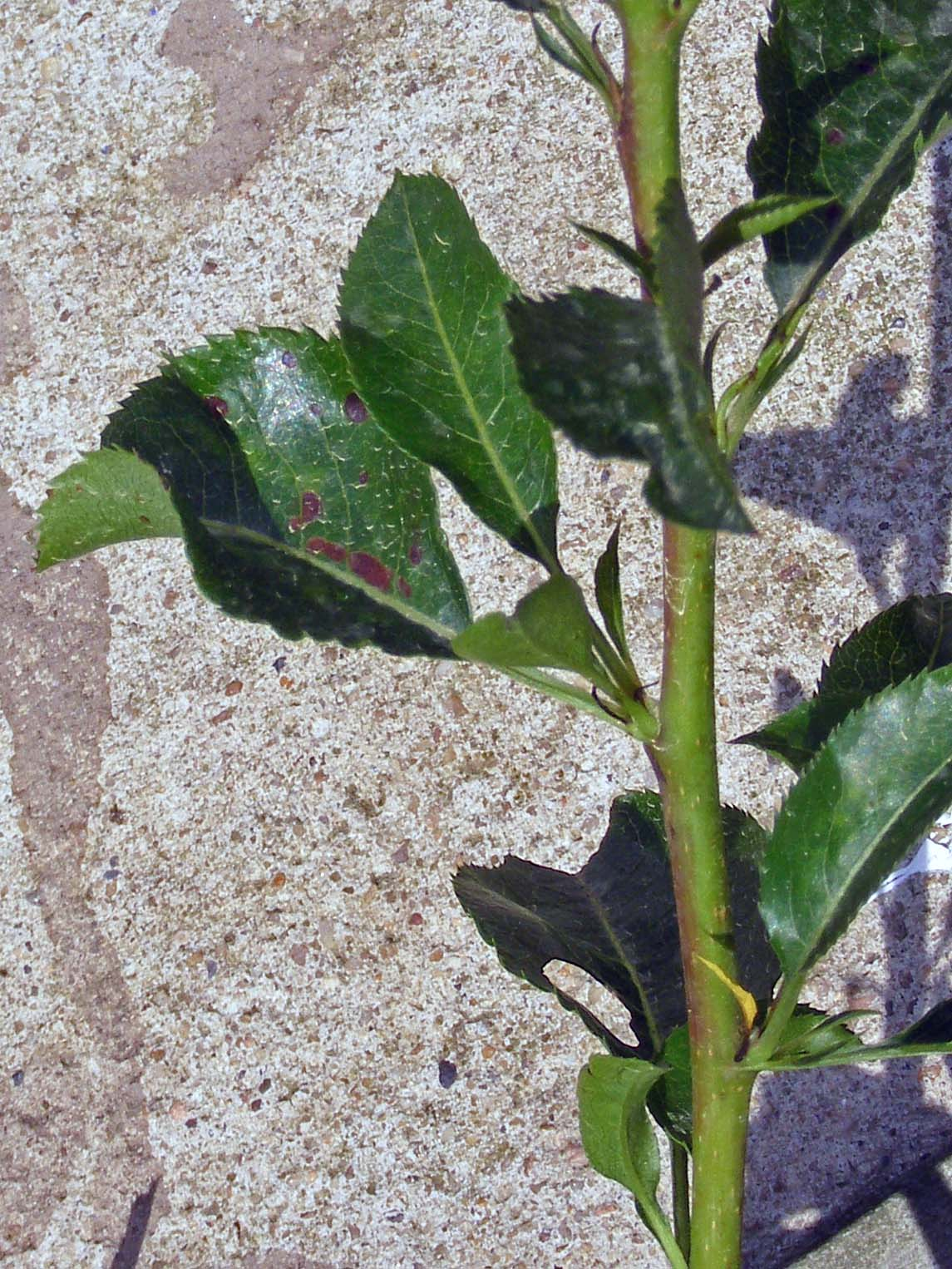
- Stemphylium vesicarium infecting leaves of a pear tree

Scientific classification
- Domain: Eukaryota
- Kingdom: Fungi
- Division: Ascomycota
- Class: Dothideomycetes
- Order: Pleosporales
- Family: Pleosporaceae
- Genus: Stemphylium
- Species: S. vesicarium

Binomial name
- Stemphylium vesicarium (Wallr.) E.G. Simmons, (1969)

Synonyms
- Synonymy (in alphabetic order): Alternaria putrefaciens (Fuckel) E.G. Simmons, Mycotaxon 55: 41 (1995); Ampullina herbarum (Pers.) Quél., Mém. Soc. Émul. Montbéliard, Sér. 2 5: 525 (1875); Cryptosphaeria herbarum (Pers.) Grev., Fl. Edin.: 361 (1824); Clasterosporium putrefaciens (Fuckel) Sacc., Syll. fung. (Abellini) 4: 393 (1886); Clasterosporium putrefaciens var. crucipes Speschnew, Fungi paras. transcuic 5: 10 (1901); Delacourea samarae (Fuckel) Cooke, Grevillea 18(no. 85): 12 (1889); Exormatostoma herbarum (Pers.) Gray, Nat. Arr. Brit. Pl. (London) 1: 522 (1821); Helminthosporium vesicarium Wallr. [as 'Helmisporium'], Fl. crypt. Germ. (Norimbergae) 2: 166 (1833); Macrosporium cheiranthi var. echinellum (Berk. & M.A. Curtis) Berk. & M.A. Curtis, in Berkeley, Grevillea 3 (no. 27): 105 (1875); Macrosporium commune Rabenh., Fungi europ. exsicc.: no. 1360 (1870); Macrosporium commune f. arachidis Sacc., Annls mycol. 13(2): 126 (1915); Macrosporium commune f. brassicae Brunaud, Act. Soc. linn. Bordeaux 52: 148 (1897); Macrosporium commune f. calotropidis Trotter, Nuovo G. bot. ital., n.s. 23: 30 (1916); Macrosporium commune f. calotropis Trotter, Annls mycol. 10(5): 514 (1912); Macrosporium commune f. campanulae D. Sacc., Mycotheca ital.: no. 794 (1901); Macrosporium commune f. heraclei Brunaud, Act. Soc. linn. Bordeaux 52: 148 (1897); Macrosporium commune f. lactucae-scarilolae Kabát & Bubák, Fungi Imperfecti exs., Fasc.: no. 345 (1906); Macrosporium commune f. leguminum Roum., Revue mycol., Toulouse 7(no. 25): 91 (1885); Macrosporium commune f. musae Berl. & Roum., Revue mycol., Toulouse 9(no. 35): 164 (1887); Macrosporium commune f. pisi Gonz. Frag., Mém. R. Soc. Española Hist. Nat. 11: 195 (1919); Macrosporium commune f. ricinis-communis Berl. & Roum., Revue mycol., Toulouse 9(no. 35): 164 (1887); Macrosporium commune f. syringae Roum., Revue mycol., Toulouse 7(no. 25): 102 (1885); Macrosporium commune var. arachidis Sacc., Annls mycol. 13(2): 126 (1915); Macrosporium commune var. echinellum (Berk. & M.A. Curtis) Sacc., Syll. fung. (Abellini) 4: 524 (1886); Macrosporium' commune var. theicola Speschnew, Trudy Tiflissk. Bot. Sada 6: 119 (1904); Macrosporium echinellum Berk. & M.A. Curtis, in Curtis, Geol. Nat. Hist. Surv. N. Carol. 3: 128 (1867); Macrosporium parasiticum Thüm., Mycoth. Univ., cent. 7: no. 667 (1877); Macrosporium sarcinula Berk., Ann. nat. Hist., Mag. Zool. Bot. Geol. 1: 261 (1838); Macrosporium vesicarium (Wallr.) Sacc., Syll. fung. (Abellini) 4: 537 (1886); Phoma albicans Roberge ex Desm., Annls Sci. Nat., Bot., sér. 3 11(2): 284 (1849); Phomopsis albicans (Roberge ex Desm.) Syd. & P. Syd., Mycotheca Germanica 20-21: no. 1012 (1911); Pleospora albicans Fuckel, Jb. nassau. Ver. Naturk. 23-24: 131 (1870); Pleospora alfalfae E.G. Simmons, Sydowia 38: 292 (1986); Pleospora allii (Rabenh.) Ces. & De Not., Comm. Soc. crittog. Ital. 1(fasc. 4): 218 (1863); Pleospora asparagi Rabenh., Klotzschii Herb. Viv. Mycol., Edn Nov, Ser. Sec., Cent. 8: no. 750 (1858); Pleospora asparagi Rabenh. ex Sacc., Syll. fung. (Abellini) 2: 268 (1883); Pleospora cheiranthi Cocc. & Morini, Mém. R. Accad. Sci. Ist. Bologna, Ser. 4 5: no. 196 (1883); Pleospora denotata (Cooke & Ellis) Sacc., Syll. fung. (Abellini) 2: 251 (1883); Pleospora euonymi Fuckel, Jb. nassau. Ver. Naturk. 23-24: 133 (1870); Pleospora euonymi f. caulicola Grove, J. Bot., Lond. 71: 285 (1933); Pleospora euonymi f. ramealis Feltgen, Vorstud Pilzfl. Luxemb., Nachtr. IV: 86 (1905); Pleospora excavata var. basitricha (Durieu & Mont.) Sacc., Syll. fung. (Abellini) 2: 248 (1883); Pleospora frangulae Fuckel, Jb. nassau. Ver. Naturk. 23-24: 133 (1870); Pleospora gymnocladi Bagnis, Atti R. Acad. Lincei, Mem. Cl. Sci. Fis., sér. 3 1: 829 (1877); Pleospora herbarum (Pers.) Rabenh., Klotzschii Herb. Viv. Mycol., Edn Nov, Ser. Sec., Cent. 6: no. 547 (1857); Pleospora herbarum f. amaryllidis Scalia, Atti Accad. Giorn. di Sci. Natur., Catania, Ser. IV 13: 33 (1900); Pleospora herbarum f. buphthalmi Scalia, Atti Accad. Giorn. di Sci. Natur., Catania, Ser. IV 13: 33 (1900); Pleospora herbarum f. camelliae Speg., Anal. Soc. cient. argent. 50(1): 37 (1900); Pleospora herbarum f. cheiranthi-cheiri Scalia, Atti Accad. Giorn. di Sci. Natur., Catania, Ser. IV 13: 33 (1900); Pleospora herbarum f. centranthi-rubri Scalia, Atti Accad. Giorn. di Sci. Natur., Catania, Ser. IV 13: 33 (1900); Pleospora herbarum f. citrorum Sacc., Michelia 2(no. 8): 417 (1882); Pleospora herbarum f. chimonanthi Scalia, Atti Accad. Giorn. di Sci. Natur., Catania, Ser. IV 14: 20 (1901); Pleospora herbarum f. crini Scalia, Atti Accad. Giorn. di Sci. Natur., Catania, Ser. IV 14: 20 (1901); Pleospora herbarum f. dahliae Scalia, Atti Accad. Giorn. di Sci. Natur., Catania, Ser. IV 13: 33 (1900); Pleospora herbarum f. daturae Scalia, Atti Accad. Giorn. di Sci. Natur., Catania, Ser. IV 13: 33 (1900); Pleospora herbarum f. euonymi Scalia, Atti Accad. Giorn. di Sci. Natur., Catania, Ser. IV 14: 20 (1901); Pleospora herbarum f. eriobotryae Scalia, Atti Accad. Giorn. di Sci. Natur., Catania, Ser. IV 14: 20 (1901); Pleospora herbarum f. ferulae Scalia, Atti Accad. Giorn. di Sci. Natur., Catania, Ser. IV 13: 33 (1900); Pleospora herbarum f. florentina Cif., Boll. Soc. bot. ital., 1923(1-2): 99 (1923); Pleospora herbarum f. foliicola Rehm, Ascomyceten: no. 145 (1873); Pleospora herbarum f. lactucum Padhi & Snyder, Phytopathology 44: 179 (1954); Pleospora herbarum f. liriodendri Berl., Nuovo G. bot. ital. 20(1): 100 (1888); Pleospora herbarum f. lilii-martagonis Scalia, Atti Accad. Giorn. di Sci. Natur., Catania, Ser. IV 14: 20 (1901); Pleospora herbarum f. lonicerae Scalia, Atti Accad. Giorn. di Sci. Natur., Catania, Ser. IV 14: 20 (1901); Pleospora herbarum f. magnoliae Scalia, Atti Accad. Giorn. di Sci. Natur., Catania, Ser. IV 14: 20 (1901); Pleospora herbarum f. mahoniae Scalia, Atti Accad. Giorn. di Sci. Natur., Catania, Ser. IV 14: 20 (1901); Pleospora herbarum f. marrubii Berl., Nuovo G. bot. ital. 20(1): 100 (1888); Pleospora herbarum f. microspora Sacc., Syll. fung. (Abellini) 2: 247 (1883); Pleospora herbarum f. minor Niessl ex Sacc., Syll. fung. (Abellini) 2: 247 (1883); Pleospora herbarum f. nepetae Gonz. Frag., Trab. Mus. Nac. Cienc. Nat., Ser. Bot. 4: 22 (1914); Pleospora herbarum f. phaseoli Scalia, Atti Accad. Giorn. di Sci. Natur., Catania, Ser. IV 13: 33 (1900); Pleospora herbarum f. psoraleae Berl., Nuovo G. bot. ital. 20(1): 100 (1888); Pleospora herbarum f. resedae Rehm, Ascomyceten, Fasc. 10: no. 486 (1878); Pleospora herbarum f. robusta Niessl ex Sacc., Syll. fung. (Abellini) 2: 247 (1883); Pleospora herbarum f. rubiae Scalia, Atti Accad. Giorn. di Sci. Natur., Catania, Ser. IV 14: 20 (1901); Pleospora herbarum f. rutae Scalia, Atti Accad. Giorn. di Sci. Natur., Catania, Ser. IV 14: 20 (1901); Pleospora herbarum f. scillae Scalia, Atti Accad. Giorn. di Sci. Natur., Catania, Ser. IV 13: 33 (1900); Pleospora herbarum f. scrophulariae Scalia, Atti Accad. Giorn. di Sci. Natur., Catania, Ser. IV 13: 33 (1900); Pleospora herbarum f. siliquaria J. Kunze, in Rehm, Ascomyceten: no. 340 (1876); Pleospora herbarum f. smilacis Scalia, Atti Accad. Giorn. di Sci. Natur., Catania, Ser. IV 13: 33 (1900); Pleospora herbarum f. solidaginis Gonz. Frag., Trab. Mus. Nac. Cienc. Nat., Ser. Bot. 4: 22 (1914); Pleospora herbarum f. spartii Pollacci, Atti Ist. Bot. 'Giovanni Briosi' 5: 37 (1896); Pleospora herbarum f. viburni Scalia, Atti Accad. Giorn. di Sci. Natur., Catania, Ser. IV 14: 20 (1901); Pleospora herbarum var. asperulina Bubák, Annln K. K. naturh. Hofmus. Wien 28(1-2): 201 (1914); Pleospora herbarum var. brassicae Sacc., Bull. Soc. mycol. Fr. 5(4): 120 (1890); Pleospora herbarum var. cheiranthi (Cocc. & Morini) Sacc. & Traverso, Syll. fung. (Abellini) 20: 439 (1911); Pleospora herbarum var. cleomes Bubák, Annln K. K. naturh. Hofmus. Wien 28(1-2): 201 (1914); Pleospora herbarum var. coluteicola Henn., Verh. bot. Ver. Prov. Brandenb. 47: XI (1905); Pleospora herbarum var. coronillae Gonz. Frag., Trab. Mus. Nac. Cienc. Nat., Ser. Bot. 12: 18 (1917); Pleospora herbarum var. coryphae Cavara & Mollica, Atti Accad. Giorn. di Sci. Natur., Catania, Ser. IV 19: 29 [repr.] (1906); Pleospora herbarum var. euphrasiae (Rabenh.) Sacc., Syll. fung. (Abellini) 1: 432 (1882); Pleospora herbarum var. galii Lambotte, Revue mycol., Toulouse 13(no. 49): 4 (1891); Pleospora herbarum var. genistae-ibericae Gonz. Frag., Trab. Mus. Nac. Cienc. Nat., Ser. Bot. 12: 18 (1917); Pleospora herbarum var. halimodendri Gonz. Frag., Trab. Mus. Nac. Cienc. Nat., Ser. Bot. 12: 18 (1917); Pleospora herbarum var. ilicis M. Bechet & N. Coman, Contr. Bot., Univ. Cluj-Napoca, Grăd. Bot.: 82 (1963); Pleospora herbarum var. liriodendri Berl., Nuovo G. bot. ital. 20(1): 100 (1888); Pleospora herbarum var. lolii (P. Karst. & Har.) Mussat, in Saccardo, Syll. fung. (Abellini) 15: 296 (1901); Pleospora herbarum var. marrubii Berl., Nuovo G. bot. ital. 20(1): 100 (1888); Pleospora herbarum var. minuscula Berl., Nuovo G. bot. ital. 20(1): 101 (1888); Pleospora herbarum var. occidentalis Wehm., Lloydia 9: 218 (1946); Pleospora herbarum var. ostryae Berl., Nuovo G. bot. ital. 20(1): 101 (1888); Pleospora herbarum var. psoraleae Berl., Nuovo G. bot. ital. 20(1): 100 (1888); Pleospora herbarum var. rutae Henn., Hedwigia 42: 218 (1903); Pleospora herbarum var. silenicola Speg., Anal. Mus. nac. Hist. nat. B. Aires 6: 284 (1898); Pleospora herbarum var. spinicola Feltgen, Vorstud Pilzfl. Luxemb., Nachtr. III: 189 (1903); Pleospora herbarum var. symphoricarpi Pass., Atti R. Acad. Lincei, Mem. Cl. Sci. Fis., sér. 4 6: no. 24 (1890); Pleospora herbarum var. triglochinis Dearn. & House, N.Y. St. Mus. Bull. 266: 75 (1925); Pleospora labiatarum (Cooke & Harkn.) Sacc., Syll. fung. (Abellini) 2: 243 (1883); Pleospora leguminum (Wallr.) Rabenh., Klotzschii Herb. Viv. Mycol., Edn Nov, Ser. Sec., Cent. 6: no. 548 (1857); Pleospora lolii P. Karst. & Har., Revue mycol., Toulouse 12(no. 48): 171 (1890); Pleospora mali Hesler, Mycologia 19(4): 223 (1927); Pleospora meliloti Rabenh., in Saccardo, Syll. fung. (Abellini) 2: 246 (1883); Pleospora meliloti f. achilleae Feltgen, Vorstud Pilzfl. Luxemb., Nachtr. III: 190 (1903); Pleospora pisi (Sowerby) Fuckel, Jb. nassau. Ver. Naturk. 23-24: 131 (1870); Pleospora pomorum A.S. Horne, J. Bot., Lond. 58: 239 (1920); Pleospora putrefaciens A.B. Frank, Krankh. Pflanz. 2: 299 (1896); Pleospora salsolae Fuckel, Hedwigia 3: 160 (1864); Pleospora samarae Fuckel, Jb. nassau. Ver. Naturk. 23-24: 131 (1870); Pleospora salsolae f. schoberiae Sacc., Michelia 2(no. 6): 69 (1880); Pleospora salsolae var. salsolae-peruvianae Speg., in Saccardo, Syll. fung. (Abellini) 2: 248 (1883); Pleospora salsolae var. basitricha (Durieu & Mont.) Berl., Nuovo G. bot. ital. 20(1): 122 (1888); Pleospora sedicola E.G. Simmons, Harvard Pap. Bot. 6(1): 202 (2001); Pleospora tomatonis E.G. Simmons, Harvard Pap. Bot. 6(1): 204 (2001); Pleospora typhae Pass. ex Brunaud, Brunaud Liste Sphaerops: 20 (1889); Sphaeria allii Rabenh., Klotzschii Herb. Viv. Mycol., Cent. 9: no. 838 (1846); Sphaeria brassicae Lasch, in Rabenhorst, Klotzschii Herb. Viv. Mycol., Edn Nov, Ser. Sec., Cent. 6: no. 550 (1857); Sphaeria denotata Cooke & Ellis, Grevillea 6(no. 37): 16 (1877); Sphaeria excavata var. basitricha Durieu & Mont., in Durieu, Expl. Sci. Alg., Fl. Algér. 1(livr. 14): 526 (1848); Sphaeria herbarum Pers., Syn. meth. fung. (Göttingen) 1: 78 (1801); Sphaeria herbarum f. euphrasiae Rabenh., Fungi europ. exsicc. Klot. herb. vivi myco. cont., Edn nova. Ser. sec., Cent. 3: no. 258 (1860); Sphaeria labiatarum Cooke & Harkn., Grevillea 9(no. 49): 8 (1880); Sphaeria leguminum Wallr., Fl. crypt. Germ. (Norimbergae) 2: 771 (1833); Sphaeria pisi Sowerby, Col. fig. Engl. Fung. Mushr. (London) 3(no. 27): tab. 393, fig. 8 (1803); Sporidesmium putrefaciens Fuckel, Jb. nassau. Ver. Naturk. 23-24: 350 (1870); Stemphylium sedicola E.G. Simmons, Harvard Pap. Bot. 6(1): 202 (2001); Stemphylium alfalfae E.G. Simmons, Sydowia 38: 292 (1986); Stemphylium herbarum E.G. Simmons, Sydowia 38: 291 (1986); Stemphylium tomatonis E.G. Simmons, Harvard Pap. Bot. 6(1): 204 (2001); Stemphylium mali Yong Wang bis & X.G. Zhang, Mycol. Progr. 8(4): 303 (2009); Stemphylium cremanthodii Y.F. Pei & X.G. Zhang, Mycotaxon 109: 494 (2009); Stemphylium brassicicola Y.F. Pei & X.G. Zhang, in Pei, Wang, Geng & Zhang, Mycotaxon 111: 169 (2010); Stemphylium commune (Rabenh.) N.F. Buchw., Fung. Imp.: 92 (1939); Stemphylium parasiticum (Thüm.) J.A. Elliott, Tech. Bull. Minn. agric. Exp. Stn 22: 43 (1924); Stigmatisphaera herbarum (Pers.) Dumort., Comment. bot. (Tournay): 89 (1822); Thyrospora parasitica (Thüm.) Angell, J. Agric. Res., Washington 38: 485 (1929)

= Stemphylium vesicarium =

Species of fungus

Stemphylium vesicarium is a plant pathogen infecting many plants including onion, garlic, asparagus, and pear.

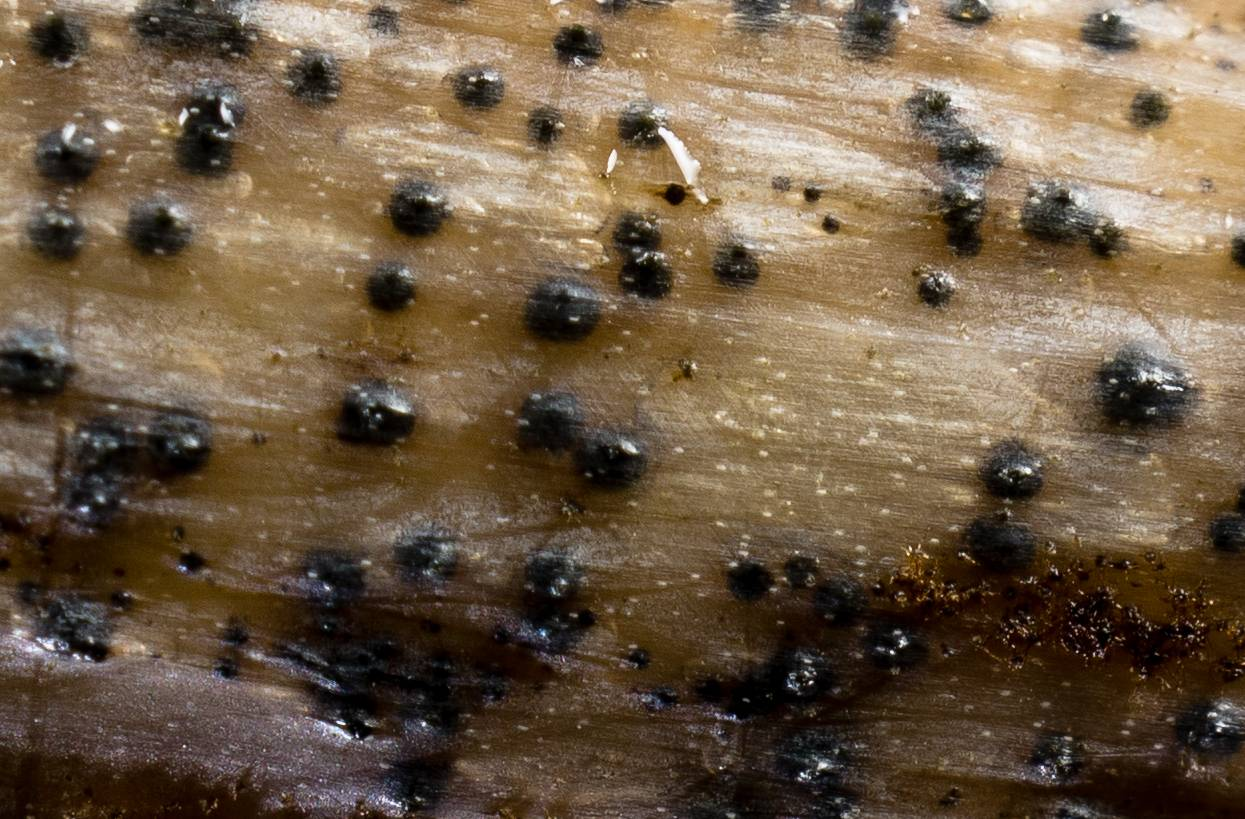
Stemphylium vesicarium (syn.Pleospora herbarum)
