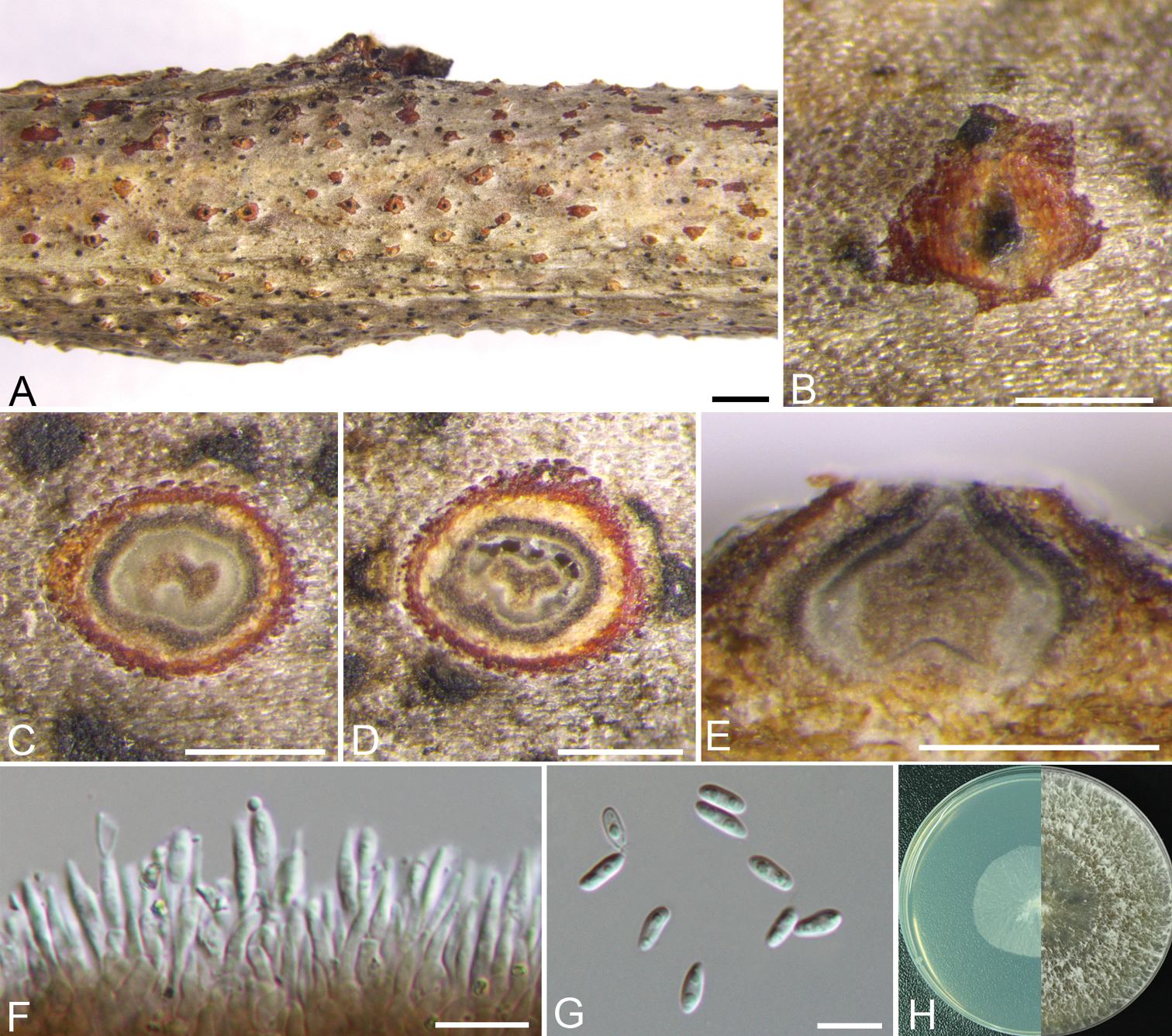

Scientific classification
- Kingdom: Fungi
- Division: Ascomycota
- Class: Sordariomycetes
- Order: Diaporthales
- Family: Diaporthaceae
- Genus: Diaporthe
- Species: D. eres

Binomial name
- Diaporthe eres Nitschke, (1870)

Synonyms
- Cryptosphaeria corniculata sensu Greville; (1985); Cucurbitaria quercus (Fuckel) Sacc. Diaporthe ambigua Nitschke, (1870); Diaporthe badhamii (Curr.) Sacc. [as 'badhami'], (1882); Diaporthe brachyceras Sacc., (1882); Diaporthe cerasi Fuckel, (1871); Diaporthe ciliaris (Curr.) Sacc., (1882); Diaporthe conorum (Desm.) Niessl, (1876); Diaporthe controversa (Desm.) Nitschke, (1871); Diaporthe discutiens (Berk.) Sacc., (1882); Diaporthe malbranchei Sacc., (1879); Diaporthe mali Miura; Diaporthe nucleata (Curr.) Sacc., (1882); Diaporthe obscurans Sacc., (1875); Diaporthe occulta (Fuckel) Nitschke, (1870); Diaporthe ophites Sacc., (1873); Diaporthe protracta Nitschke, (1870); Diaporthe quadrinucleata (Curr.) Sacc., (1882); Diaporthe quercus Fuckel, (1873); Diaporthe rehmii Nitschke, (1870); Diaporthe resecans Nitschke, (1870); Diaporthe rhododendri Feltgen, (1903); Diaporthe velata (Pers.) Nitschke, (1870); Diaporthe viridarii Sacc., (1881); Diatrype badhamii Curr., (1858); Diatrype nucleata Curr., (1858); Macrodiaporthe occulta (Fuckel) Petr., (1920); Melanconis occulta (Fuckel) Sacc., (1882); Phoma ambigua (Nitschke) Sacc., (1873); Phoma ambigua Sacc.,(1880); Phoma anceps Sacc., (1881); Phoma conorum Sacc., (1882); Phoma controversa (Desm.) Sacc. Phoma oblonga Desm., (1853); Phoma occulta Desm., (1841); Phoma ophites Sacc., (1884); Phoma velata Sacc., (1880); Phomopsis ambigua (Sacc.) Traverso, (1906); Phomopsis conorum (Sacc.) Died., (1911); Phomopsis controversa (Sacc.) Traverso, (1906); Phomopsis oblonga (Desm.) Traverso, (1906); Phomopsis ophites (Sacc.) Traverso, (1906); Phomopsis velata (Sacc.) Traverso, (1906); Sphaeria badhamii Curr. Sphaeria ciliaris Curr., (1859); Sphaeria conorum Desm., (1846); Sphaeria controversa Desm.,(1841); Sphaeria discutiens Berk., (1836); Sphaeria nucleata Curr. Sphaeria quadrinucleata Curr., (1859); Sphaeria resecans (Nitschke) W. Phillips & Plowr. Sphaeria velata Pers., (1801); Valsa controversa (Desm.) Cooke; Valsa occulta Fuckel; Valsa resecans (Nitschke) Cooke & Plowr.

= Diaporthe eres =

Species of fungus

Diaporthe eres is a fungal plant pathogen, which is the type species of genus ''Diaporthe''. It causes canker disease in a wide variety of hosts. This species has a long history, having been described many times under various synonyms, for instance, the fungus was illustrated by James Sowerby in 1803 under the name Sphaeria ciliaris, attributed to Bulliard. The name D. eres has been proposed for conservation in order to avoid bothersome name changes due to priority.
