= Phomopsis asparagicola =

Scientific classification
- Kingdom: Fungi
- Division: Ascomycota
- Class: Sordariomycetes
- Order: Diaporthales
- Family: Valsaceae
- Genus: Phomopsis
- Species: P. asparagicola

Binomial name
- Phomopsis asparagicola Alcalde (1952)

Species of fungus

Phomopsis asparagicola is a plant pathogen that causes Phomopsis blight in asparagus.
