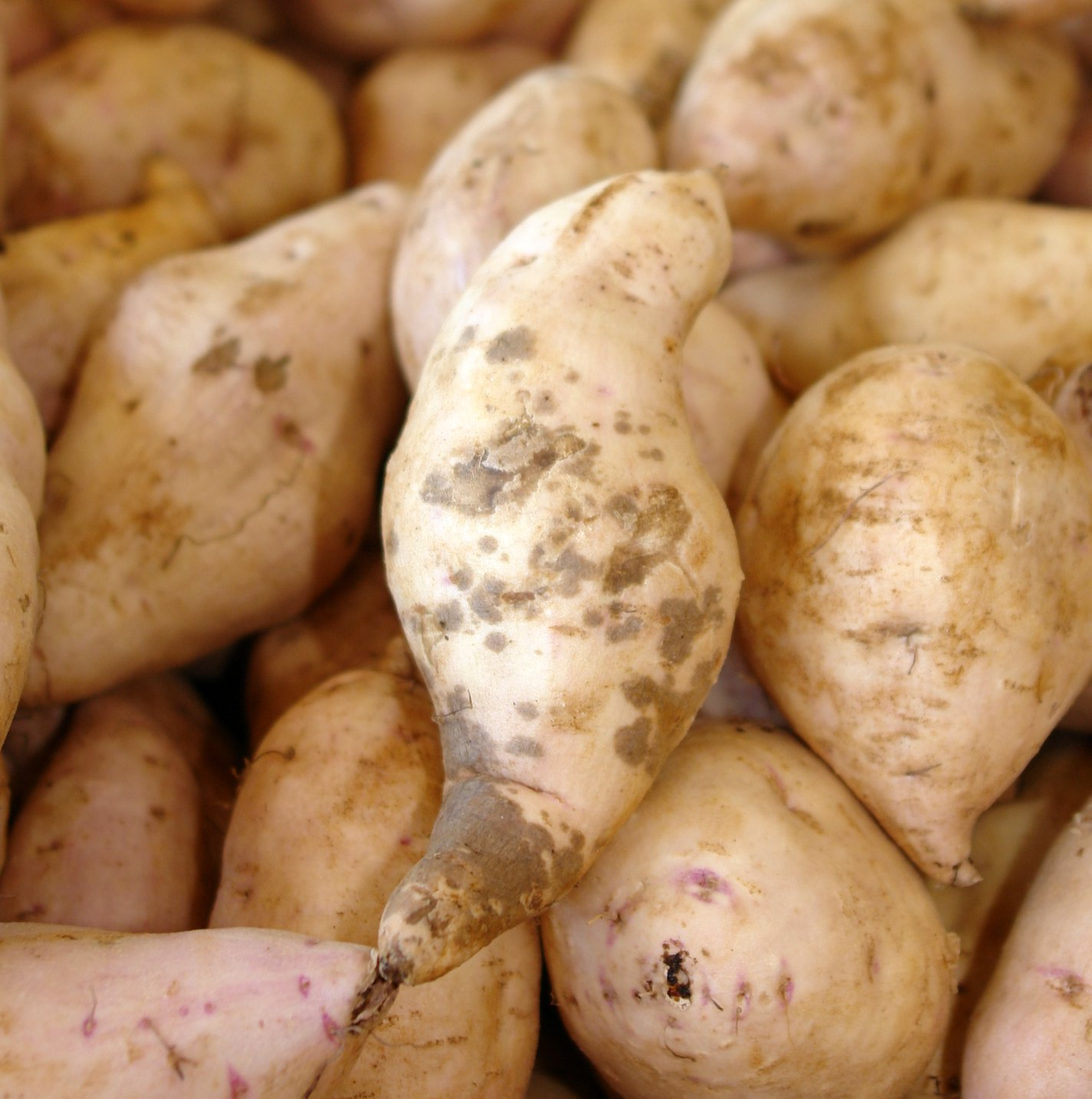
- Monilochaetes infuscans on Okinawan purple variety of Ipomoea batatas

Scientific classification
- Kingdom: Fungi
- Division: Ascomycota
- Class: Sordariomycetes
- Order: Glomerellales
- Family: Australiascaceae
- Genus: Monilochaetes
- Species: M. infuscans

Binomial name
- Monilochaetes infuscans Harter, (1916)

= Monilochaetes infuscans =

Species of fungus

Monilochaetes infuscans is an ascomycete fungus that is a plant pathogen.
