= Plenodomus destruens =

Scientific classification
- Kingdom: Fungi
- Division: Ascomycota
- Class: Dothideomycetes
- Order: Pleosporales
- Family: Leptosphaeriaceae
- Genus: Plenodomus
- Species: P. destruens

Binomial name
- Plenodomus destruens Harter, (1913)

Synonyms
- Phomopsis destruens (Harter) Boerema (1996)

Species of fungus

Plenodomus destruens or Diaporthe destruens is a fungal plant pathogen infecting sweet potatoes known as foot rot. It can affect sweet potatoes regardless of their age, and it decays them with lesions that eventually increase in size. The fungus causes wilting in sweet potato plants, causes leaves to turn yellow, and causes the part of the stem closest to the soil to turn brown. Foot rot can lead to plant death. In Brazil, it is considered a major disease for sweet potatoes and can destroy entire crops. Foot rot typically impacts sweet potatoes mid-season to harvest times, but can be controlled using similar methods to control fungal plant pathogens Monilochaetes infuscans and Ceratocystis fimbriata. Some chemicals used to control the fungus include benomyl, thiabendazole and captan.

First observed in Virginia in 1913, foot rot affects sweet potatoes in certain areas of North America and South America, eastern Africa, and New Zealand. It also affects members of the genus Jacquemontia.
