= Phyllosticta batatas =

Scientific classification
- Kingdom: Fungi
- Division: Ascomycota
- Class: Dothideomycetes
- Order: Botryosphaeriales
- Family: Botryosphaeriaceae
- Genus: Phyllosticta
- Species: P. batatas

Binomial name
- Phyllosticta batatas (Thüm.) Sacc. [as 'batatae'], (1884)

Synonyms
- Depazea batatas Thüm. [as 'batatae'], (1876); Phomopsis ipomoeae-batatas Punith., (1982); Phyllosticta batatas (Thüm.) Cooke, (1878); Phyllosticta bataticola Ellis & G. Martin, (1882)

Pathogenic fungus

Phyllosticta batatas is a fungal plant pathogen infecting sweet potatoes.

== Distribution ==
Most commonly in the Southern US. Occasionally anywhere from New Jersey to Florida, west to Texas and Kansas.
