= List of hemp diseases =

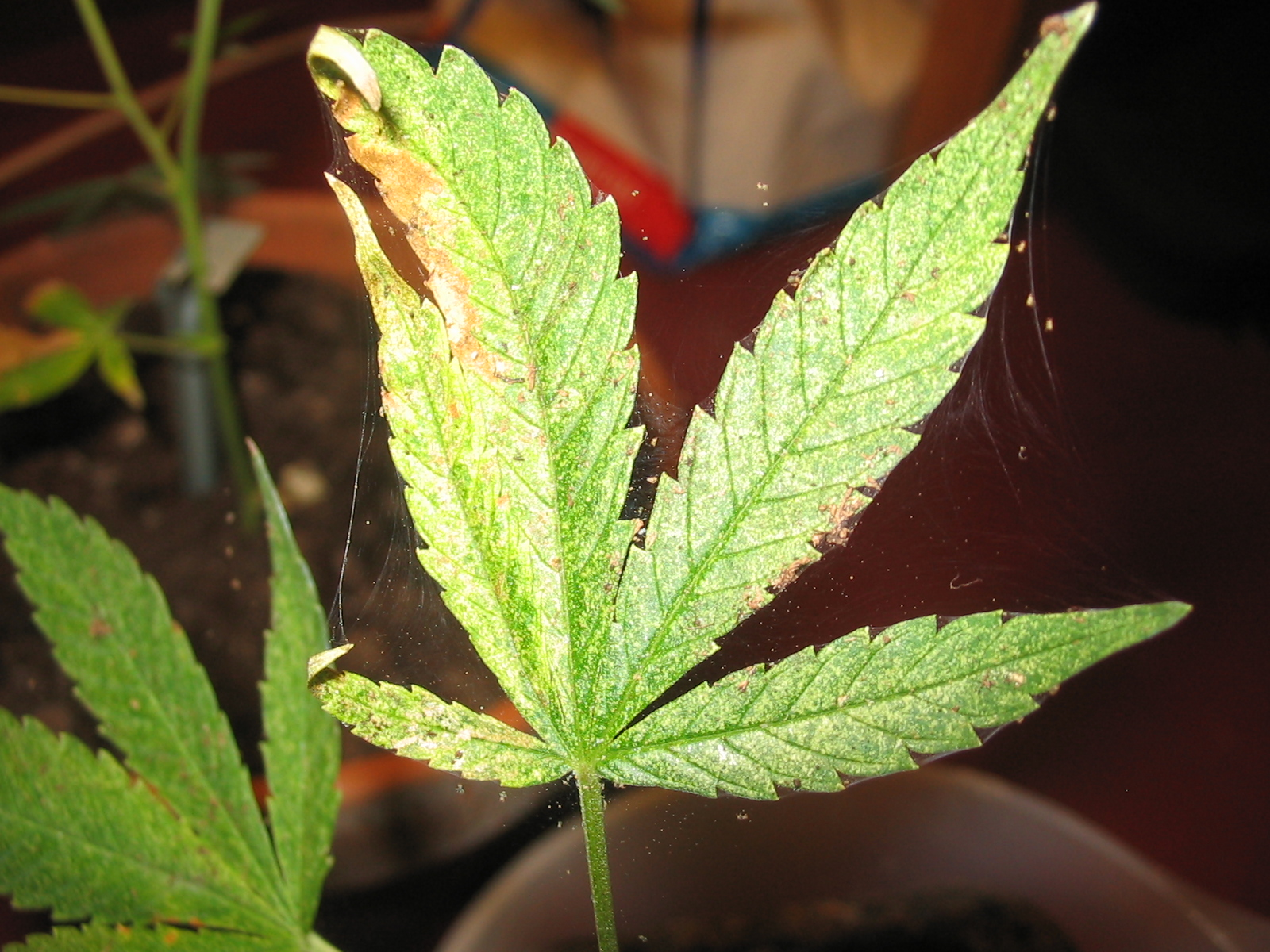
Hemp leaf being attacked by red spider mites

This is a list of diseases of hemp (Cannabis sativa).

== Bacterial diseases ==
Bacterial diseases
Bacterial blight	Pseudomonas cannabina
Crown gall	Agrobacterium tumefaciens
Striatura ulcerosa	Pseudomonas amygdali pv. mori
Xanthomonas leaf spot	Xanthomonas campestris pv. cannabis

== Fungal diseases ==
Fungal diseases
Anthracnose	Colletotrichum coccodes = Colletotrichum atramentarium = Colletotrichum dematium
Black dot disease	Epicoccum nigrum = Epicoccum purpurascens
Black mildew	Schiffnerula cannabis
Brown blight	Alternaria alternata = Alternaria tenuis
Brown leaf spot and stem canker	Ascochyta spp. Ascochyta prasadii Phoma spp. Didymella spp. [teleomorph] Phoma exigua Phoma glomerata Phoma herbarum
Charcoal rot	Macrophomina phaseolina
Cladosporium stem canker	Cladosporium cladosporioides Cladosporium herbarum Mycosphaerella tassiana [teleomorph]
Curvularia leaf spot	Curvularia cymbopogonis Curvularia lunata Cochliobolus lunatus [teleomorph]
Cylindrosporium blight	Cylindrosporium spp. Cylindrosporium cannabinum
Damping-off	Botrytis cinerea Botryotinia fuckeliana [teleomorph] Fusarium oxysporum Fusarium solani Nectria haematococca [teleomorph] Macrophomina phaseolina Pythium aphanidermatum Pythium debaryanum Pythium ultimum Rhizoctonia solani Thanatephorus cucumeris [teleomorph] = Pellicularia filamentosa
Downy mildew	Pseudoperonospora cannabina Pseudoperonospora humuli
Fusarium foot rot and root rot	Fusarium solani
Fusarium stem canker	Fusarium sulphureum Gibberella cyanogena [teleomorph] = Gibberella saubinetii
Fusarium wilt	Fusarium oxysporum f.sp. cannabis Fusarium oxysporum f.sp. vasinfectum
Gray mold	Botrytis cinerea
Hemp canker	Sclerotinia sclerotiorum
Leptosphaeria blight	Leptosphaeria cannabina Leptosphaeria woroninii Leptosphaeria acuta
Olive leaf spot	Cercospora cannabis Pseudocercospora cannabina
Ophiobolus stem canker	Ophiobolus cannabinus Ophiobolus anguillides
Phoma stem canker	Phoma herbarum Phoma exigua
Phomopsis stem canker	Phomopsis cannabina Phomopsis achilleae Diaporthe arctii var. achilleae [teleomorph]
Phymatotrichum root rot Cotton root rot	Phymatotrichopsis omnivora = Phymatotrichum omnivorum
Pink rot	Trichothecium roseum = Cephalothecium roseum
Powdery mildew	Podosphaera macularis Golovinomyces ambrosiae complex
Red boot	Melanospora cannabis (secondary on hemp canker)
Rhizoctonia soreshin and root rot	Rhizoctonia solani
Rust	Aecidium cannabis Uredo kriegeriana Uromyces inconspicuus
Southern blight Sclerotium root and stem rot	Sclerotium rolfsii Athelia rolfsii [teleomorph]
Stemphylium leaf and stem spot	Stemphylium botryosum Pleospora tarda [teleomorph] Stemphylium cannabinum
Tar spot	Phyllachora cannabis
Tropical rot	Lasiodiplodia theobromae = Botryodiplodia theobromae
Twig blight	Dendrophoma marconii Botryosphaeria marconii [teleomorph]
Verticillium wilt	Verticillium albo-atrum Verticillium dahliae
White leaf spot	Phomopsis ganjae
Yellow leaf spot	Septoria cannabis Septoria cannabina

== Nematodes, parasitic ==
Nematodes, parasitic
Cyst	Heterodera humuli Heterodera schachtii
Needle	Paralongidorus maximus = Longidorus maximus
Root-knot	Meloidogyne incognita Meloidogyne javanica
Stem	Ditylenchus dipsaci

== Viral diseases ==
Viral diseases
Alfalfa mosaic & Lucerne mosaic	genus Alfamovirus, Alfalfa mosaic virus (AMV)
Arabis mosaic	genus Nepovirus, Arabis mosaic virus (ArMV)
Cucumber mosaic	genus Cucumovirus, Cucumber mosaic virus (CMV)
Hemp mosaic	genus ?Tobamovirus
Hemp streak	genus ?, Hemp streak virus

== Phytoplasmal diseases ==
Phytoplasmal diseases

Witches' broom

== Miscellaneous diseases and disorders ==
Miscellaneous diseases and disorders
Fasciation	Cause undetermined
Grey fleck	Magnesium deficiency
Tipburn & leaf margin necrosis	Potassium deficiency
