= Cladosporium elegans =

Scientific classification
- Domain: Eukaryota
- Kingdom: Fungi
- Division: Ascomycota
- Class: Dothideomycetes
- Order: Capnodiales
- Family: Davidiellaceae
- Genus: Cladosporium
- Species: C. elegans

Binomial name
- Cladosporium elegans Penz. (1882)

Subspecies
- Cladosporium elegans var. elegans Penz. (1882); Cladosporium elegans var. singaporense Sacc. (1921)

Synonyms
- Cladosporium elegans Matsush. (1975)

Species of fungus

Cladosporium elegans is a species of fungus in the genus Cladosporium (anamorphic Davidiella). It forms arid brown spots on living leaves of oranges in Italy.
