= N-alkylglycine oxidase =

Identifiers
- EC no.: 1.5.3.20

Databases
- IntEnz: IntEnz view
- BRENDA: BRENDA entry
- ExPASy: NiceZyme view
- KEGG: KEGG entry
- MetaCyc: metabolic pathway
- PRIAM: profile
- PDB structures: RCSB PDB PDBe PDBsum
Search
- PMC: articles
- PubMed: articles
- NCBI: proteins

N-alkylglycine oxidase (EC 1.5.3.20, N-carboxymethylalkylamine:oxygen oxidoreductase (decarboxymethylating)) is an enzyme with systematic name N-alkylglycine:oxygen oxidoreductase (alkylamine forming). This enzyme catalyses the following chemical reaction

N-alkylglycine + H_{2}O + O_{2} $\rightleftharpoons$ alkylamine + glyoxalate + H_{2}O_{2}

Isolated from the mold Cladosporium sp. G-10.
