= Ophiobolus =

Scientific classification
- Kingdom: Fungi
- Division: Ascomycota
- Class: Dothideomycetes
- Order: Pleosporales
- Family: Phaeosphaeriaceae
- Genus: Ophiobolus; Riess (1854)

Type species
- Ophiobolus disseminans Riess (1854)

Species
- See text

Synonyms
- Entodesmium Riess; Leptosphaeriopsis

Genus of fungi

Ophiobolus is a genus of fungi in the family Phaeosphaeriaceae.

== Species ==
- Ophiobolus acerinus
- Ophiobolus aconiti
- Ophiobolus actinidiae
- Ophiobolus acuminatus
- Ophiobolus adnatus
- Ophiobolus affinis
- Ophiobolus alismatis
- Ophiobolus andropognis
- Ophiobolus angelensis
- Ophiobolus anguillides
- Ophiobolus annonae
- Ophiobolus anonae
- Ophiobolus antarcticus
- Ophiobolus antenoreus
- Ophiobolus anthemidis
- Ophiobolus anthrisci
- Ophiobolus arenarius
- Ophiobolus artemisiae
- Ophiobolus artemisiicola
- Ophiobolus asclepiadis
- Ophiobolus aspiciliae
- Ophiobolus asteris
- Ophiobolus atropae
- Ophiobolus australiensis
- Ophiobolus babajaniae
- Ophiobolus babajanii
- Ophiobolus bacillatus
- Ophiobolus bactrosporus
- Ophiobolus barbanae
- Ophiobolus barbarus
- Ophiobolus barbatus
- Ophiobolus bardanae
- Ophiobolus bonplandii
- Ophiobolus brachyascus
- Ophiobolus brachysporus
- Ophiobolus brachystoma
- Ophiobolus brachystomus
- Ophiobolus broussonetiae
- Ophiobolus buddleiae
- Ophiobolus buddlejae
- Ophiobolus butleri
- Ophiobolus byssicola
- Ophiobolus caballeroi
- Ophiobolus cajani
- Ophiobolus calaminthae
- Ophiobolus calathicola
- Ophiobolus calathus
- Ophiobolus camptosporus
- Ophiobolus cannabinus
- Ophiobolus cantareirensis
- Ophiobolus capitatus
- Ophiobolus cardomae
- Ophiobolus cariceti
- Ophiobolus carneus
- Ophiobolus carpathicus
- Ophiobolus castillejae
- Ophiobolus catharanthicola
- Ophiobolus cesatianus
- Ophiobolus chaetophorus
- Ophiobolus characiae
- Ophiobolus characias
- Ophiobolus chilensis
- Ophiobolus chrysanthemi
- Ophiobolus cirsii
- Ophiobolus cirsii-altissimi
- Ophiobolus claviger
- Ophiobolus clavisporus
- Ophiobolus clematidis
- Ophiobolus coffeae
- Ophiobolus coffeatus
- Ophiobolus coicis
- Ophiobolus collapsus
- Ophiobolus comatus
- Ophiobolus compar
- Ophiobolus compressus
- Ophiobolus consimilis
- Ophiobolus constrictus
- Ophiobolus crassus
- Ophiobolus culmorum
- Ophiobolus cytisi-laburni
- Ophiobolus dictamni
- Ophiobolus didolotii
- Ophiobolus dipsaci
- Ophiobolus disseminans
- Ophiobolus dothidearum
- Ophiobolus dracocephali-altaijensis
- Ophiobolus dracocephali-altajensis
- Ophiobolus drechsleri
- Ophiobolus eburensis
- Ophiobolus echii
- Ophiobolus echinopis
- Ophiobolus edax
- Ophiobolus elaeosporus
- Ophiobolus elegans
- Ophiobolus ellisianus
- Ophiobolus epilobii
- Ophiobolus eryngii
- Ophiobolus erythrosporus
- Ophiobolus eucalypti
- Ophiobolus eucalyptus
- Ophiobolus eucryptus
- Ophiobolus euphorbiae
- Ophiobolus eusporus
- Ophiobolus exilis
- Ophiobolus feltgeni
- Ophiobolus feltgenii
- Ophiobolus festucae
- Ophiobolus filiformis
- Ophiobolus filisporus
- Ophiobolus florentinus
- Ophiobolus fragilisporus
- Ophiobolus fragmentarius
- Ophiobolus fruticum
- Ophiobolus fulgidus
- Ophiobolus galii
- Ophiobolus galii-veri
- Ophiobolus gangetici
- Ophiobolus gangeticum
- Ophiobolus georginae
- Ophiobolus glomus
- Ophiobolus gnaphalii
- Ophiobolus gonatosporus
- Ophiobolus gracilis
- Ophiobolus graffianus
- Ophiobolus graminicolus
- Ophiobolus graminis
- Ophiobolus granati
- Ophiobolus halimodendri
- Ophiobolus halimus
- Ophiobolus hamasporus
- Ophiobolus hazslinszkyi
- Ophiobolus helianthi
- Ophiobolus helianthi
- Ophiobolus helicosporus
- Ophiobolus herbarum
- Ophiobolus herpotrichus
- Ophiobolus hesperidis
- Ophiobolus hesperidis
- Ophiobolus heterostrophus
- Ophiobolus heveae
- Ophiobolus hormosporus
- Ophiobolus huebneri
- Ophiobolus humuli
- Ophiobolus hyperici
- Ophiobolus hypophyllus
- Ophiobolus hübneri
- Ophiobolus idamalayarensis
- Ophiobolus immersus
- Ophiobolus implexus
- Ophiobolus incomptus
- Ophiobolus incomptus
- Ophiobolus indigoferae
- Ophiobolus inflatus
- Ophiobolus ingae
- Ophiobolus instabilis
- Ophiobolus intermedius
- Ophiobolus ipohensis
- Ophiobolus isiacus
- Ophiobolus italicus
- Ophiobolus jacobaeae
- Ophiobolus javanicus
- Ophiobolus junci
- Ophiobolus juncicola
- Ophiobolus junicola
- Ophiobolus kavinae
- Ophiobolus kniepii
- Ophiobolus koerberi
- Ophiobolus kugitangi
- Ophiobolus kusanoi
- Ophiobolus laminariae
- Ophiobolus landoltii
- Ophiobolus lantanae
- Ophiobolus lapponicus
- Ophiobolus lathyri
- Ophiobolus lepidolophae
- Ophiobolus leptospermus
- Ophiobolus leptosphaerioides
- Ophiobolus leptosphaerioides
- Ophiobolus leptosporus
- Ophiobolus licualae
- Ophiobolus linosporoides
- Ophiobolus lithophilus
- Ophiobolus littoralis
- Ophiobolus littoralis
- Ophiobolus livistonae
- Ophiobolus lohwagianus
- Ophiobolus longisporus
- Ophiobolus lonicerae
- Ophiobolus malleolus
- Ophiobolus manihotis
- Ophiobolus maquilingianus
- Ophiobolus maritimus
- Ophiobolus mathieui
- Ophiobolus mayorii
- Ophiobolus medusa
- Ophiobolus medusae
- Ophiobolus megalosporus
- Ophiobolus melghatibus
- Ophiobolus melghaticus
- Ophiobolus melioloides
- Ophiobolus microstomus
- Ophiobolus minor
- Ophiobolus miscanthi
- Ophiobolus miyabeanus
- Ophiobolus montagneanus
- Ophiobolus montellicus
- Ophiobolus moravicus
- Ophiobolus morthieri
- Ophiobolus munkii
- Ophiobolus murashkinskyi
- Ophiobolus myrti
- Ophiobolus niesslii
- Ophiobolus nigrifacta
- Ophiobolus nigrificans
- Ophiobolus nigroclypeatus
- Ophiobolus nigromaculatus
- Ophiobolus nipae
- Ophiobolus oedema
- Ophiobolus oedistoma
- Ophiobolus olivaceus
- Ophiobolus ophioboloides
- Ophiobolus origani
- Ophiobolus oryzae
- Ophiobolus oryzinus
- Ophiobolus oxysporus
- Ophiobolus paludosus
- Ophiobolus paluster
- Ophiobolus palustris
- Ophiobolus pangkarensis
- Ophiobolus panici
- Ophiobolus paraensis
- Ophiobolus paraënsis
- Ophiobolus parmensis
- Ophiobolus passiflorae
- Ophiobolus pastinaceus
- Ophiobolus peduncularis
- Ophiobolus pellitus
- Ophiobolus peltigerae
- Ophiobolus peltigerarum
- Ophiobolus penicillus
- Ophiobolus periclymeni
- Ophiobolus persolinus
- Ophiobolus petiolaris
- Ophiobolus phlomidis
- Ophiobolus phragmosporus
- Ophiobolus polygoni
- Ophiobolus polytrichi
- Ophiobolus ponticus
- Ophiobolus porphyrogonus
- Ophiobolus prunellae
- Ophiobolus prunicola
- Ophiobolus pseudacori
- Ophiobolus pseudaffinis
- Ophiobolus ptarmicae
- Ophiobolus purpureus
- Ophiobolus rechingeri
- Ophiobolus resedae
- Ophiobolus rhagadioli
- Ophiobolus rhamni
- Ophiobolus rivulariosporus
- Ophiobolus robustus
- Ophiobolus rossicus
- Ophiobolus rostrupii
- Ophiobolus rubellus
- Ophiobolus rudis
- Ophiobolus sajanycus
- Ophiobolus salicinus
- Ophiobolus salinus
- Ophiobolus salsolae
- Ophiobolus sambuci
- Ophiobolus sarmenti
- Ophiobolus sarmentorum
- Ophiobolus sarothamni
- Ophiobolus sativus
- Ophiobolus saturejae
- Ophiobolus sceliscophorus
- Ophiobolus schwarzmanianus
- Ophiobolus scolymi
- Ophiobolus scrophulariae
- Ophiobolus scrophulariae
- Ophiobolus senecionis
- Ophiobolus seriatus
- Ophiobolus setariae
- Ophiobolus shoemakeri
- Ophiobolus smyrnii
- Ophiobolus solidaginis
- Ophiobolus spina
- Ophiobolus spirosporus
- Ophiobolus staphylinus
- Ophiobolus steinii
- Ophiobolus stenosporus
- Ophiobolus stictisporus
- Ophiobolus stipae
- Ophiobolus stromaticus
- Ophiobolus styracincola
- Ophiobolus subgen. Ophiobolus
- Ophiobolus subgen. Ophiochaeta
- Ophiobolus subgen. Plejobolus
- Ophiobolus subolivaceus
- Ophiobolus surculorum
- Ophiobolus tanaceti
- Ophiobolus tenellus
- Ophiobolus tenuis
- Ophiobolus terebinthi
- Ophiobolus thallicola
- Ophiobolus theissenii
- Ophiobolus therryanus
- Ophiobolus tortilis
- Ophiobolus trechisporus
- Ophiobolus trichellus
- Ophiobolus trichisporus
- Ophiobolus trichosporus
- Ophiobolus troakei
- Ophiobolus typhae
- Ophiobolus ulnosporus
- Ophiobolus urticae
- Ophiobolus verminosus
- Ophiobolus vermisporus
- Ophiobolus versisporus
- Ophiobolus virgultorum
- Ophiobolus vitalbae
- Ophiobolus volkartii
- Ophiobolus vulgaris
- Ophiobolus xanthii
- Ophiobolus zeae
