= Cladosporium musae =

Scientific classification
- Domain: Eukaryota
- Kingdom: Fungi
- Division: Ascomycota
- Class: Dothideomycetes
- Order: Capnodiales
- Family: Davidiellaceae
- Genus: Cladosporium
- Species: C. musae

Binomial name
- Cladosporium musae E.W.Mason (1945)

Synonyms
- Metulocladosporiella musae; Periconiella sapientumicola

Species of fungus

Cladosporium musae is a fungal plant pathogen that causes Cladosporium speckle on banana and which occurs in most countries in which the fruit is cultivated. Unsuccessful attempts to transfer the Cladosporium pathogen in vitro to healthy banana plants seem to confirm reports that the infection remains latent in otherwise healthy plants.
