= P. maximus =

P. maximus may refer to:

- Paralongidorus maximus, a plant pathogenic nematode species
- Pecari maximus, the giant peccary, a possible fourth species of peccary, discovered in Brazil
- Pecten maximus, the great scallop or king scallop, an edible saltwater clam species
- Physalaemus maximus, a frog species endemic to Brazil
- Prosaurolophus maximus, a hadrosaurid dinosaur species from the Late Cretaceous of North America
- P.Maximus, a music producer and song writer, Phineas Maphet

== See also ==
- Maximus (disambiguation)
