= Leptosphaeria orae-maris =

Scientific classification
- Domain: Eukaryota
- Kingdom: Fungi
- Division: Ascomycota
- Class: Dothideomycetes
- Order: Pleosporales
- Family: Leptosphaeriaceae
- Genus: Leptosphaeria
- Species: L. orae-maris

Binomial name
- Leptosphaeria orae-maris Linder, 1944

Species of fungus

Leptosphaeria orae-maris is a marine fungus. The chemical compound leptosphaerin has been isolated from it.
