= Cladosporium oncobae =

Scientific classification
- Domain: Eukaryota
- Kingdom: Fungi
- Division: Ascomycota
- Class: Dothideomycetes
- Order: Capnodiales
- Family: Davidiellaceae
- Genus: Cladosporium
- Species: C. oncobae

Binomial name
- Cladosporium oncobae Braun, Hill & Schubert (2006)

Species of fungus

Cladosporium oncobae is a fungus.
