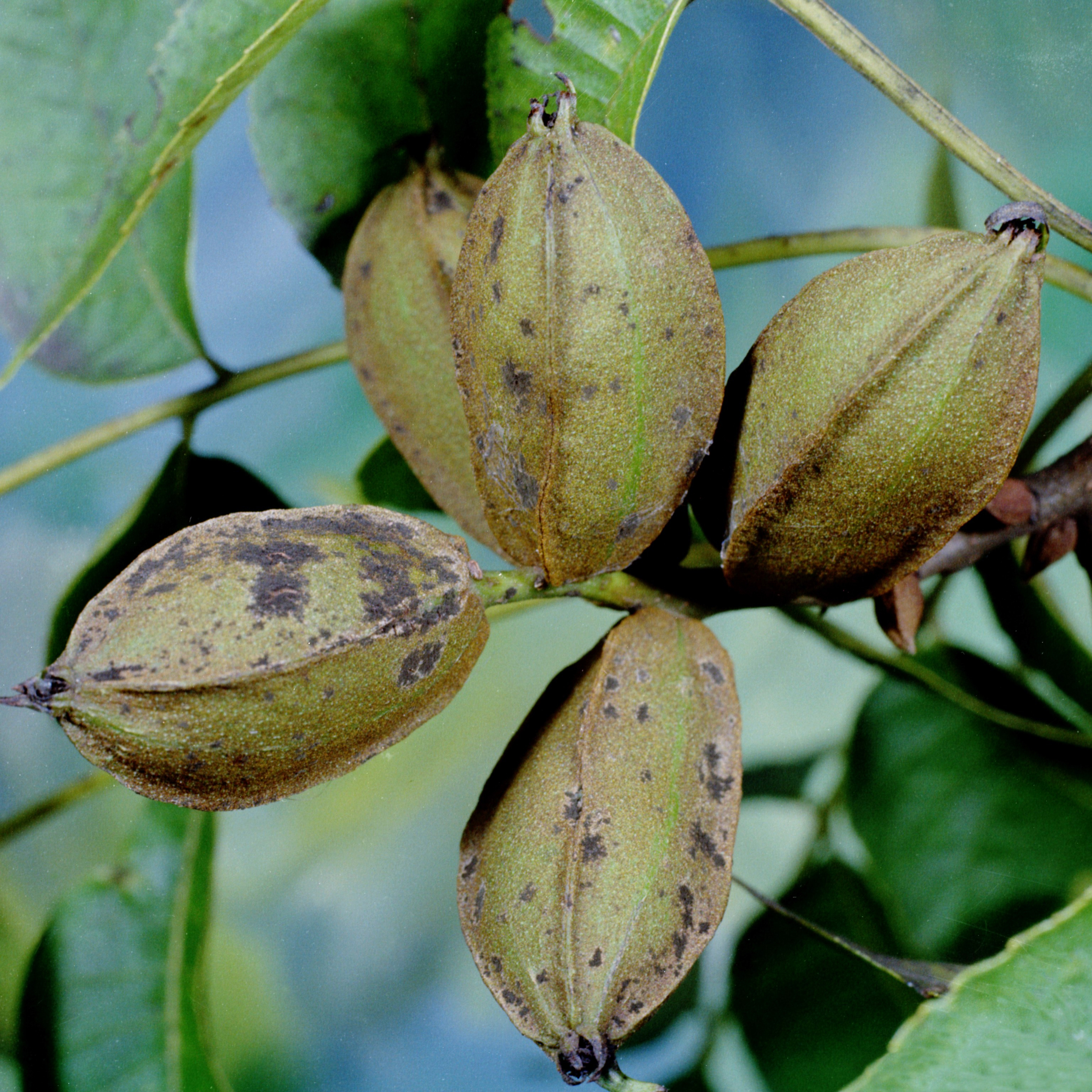

Scientific classification
- Domain: Eukaryota
- Kingdom: Fungi
- Division: Ascomycota
- Class: Dothideomycetes
- Order: Capnodiales
- Family: Davidiellaceae
- Genus: Cladosporium
- Species: C. caryigenum

Binomial name
- Cladosporium caryigenum (Ellis & Langl.) Gottwald (1982)

Synonyms
- Fusicladium caryigenum Ellis & Langl. (1888)

= Cladosporium caryigenum =

Species of fungus

Cladosporium caryigenum is a synonym of Fusicladium effusum, the plant pathogen which causes pecan scab. Pecan scab is the most economically significant disease of pecan (Carya illinoinensis) in the southeastern United States. In 2010, Seyran and colleagues used sequencing of the mitochondrial gene for cytochrome b to conclusively classify the pecan scab fungus as Fusicladium effusum.
