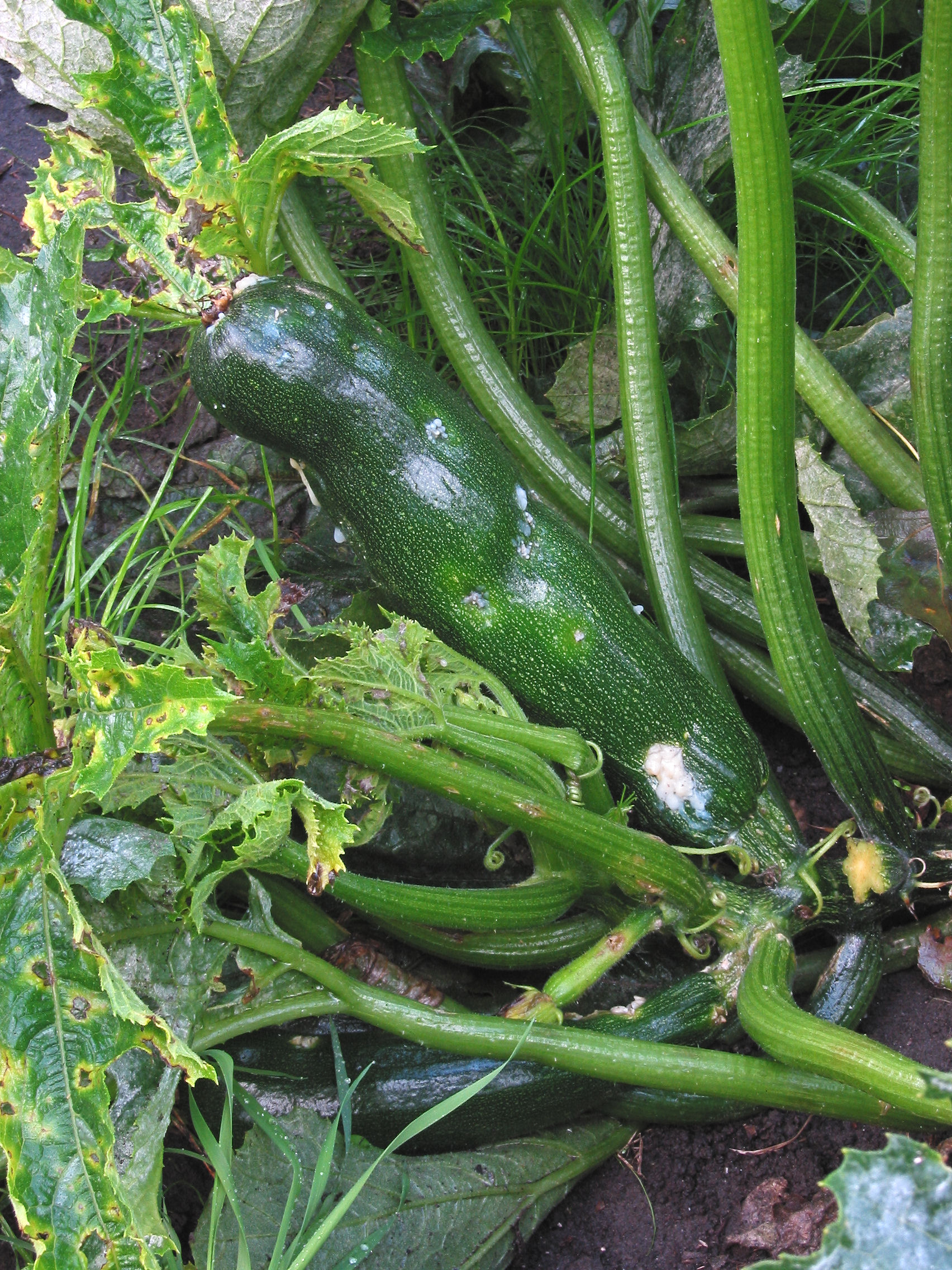

Scientific classification
- Domain: Eukaryota
- Kingdom: Fungi
- Division: Ascomycota
- Class: Dothideomycetes
- Order: Capnodiales
- Family: Davidiellaceae
- Genus: Cladosporium
- Species: C. cucumerinum

Binomial name
- Cladosporium cucumerinum Ellis & Arthur (1889)

Synonyms
- Cladosporium cucumeris A.B.Frank; Cladosporium scabies Cooke; Macrosporium melophthorum (Prill. & Delacr.) Rostr. (1893); Scolicotrichum melophthorum Prill. & Delacr. (1891)

= Cladosporium cucumerinum =

Species of fungus

Cladosporium cucumerinum is a fungal plant pathogen that affects cucumbers.
