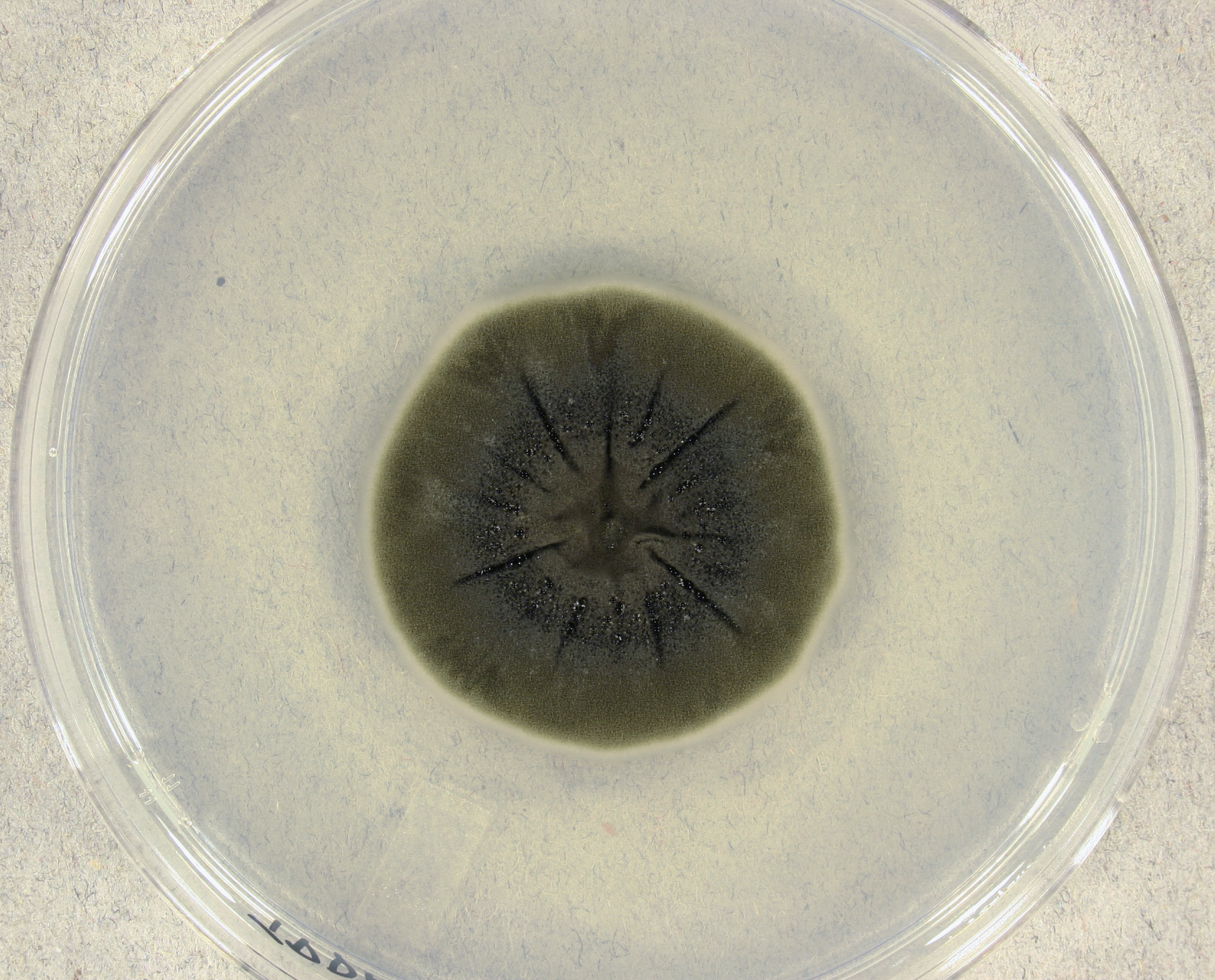

Scientific classification
- Kingdom: Fungi
- Division: Ascomycota
- Class: Dothideomycetes
- Order: Cladosporiales
- Family: Cladosporiaceae
- Genus: Cladosporium
- Species: C. sphaerospermum

Binomial name
- Cladosporium sphaerospermum Penz. (1882)

= Cladosporium sphaerospermum =

Species of radiotrophic fungus

Cladosporium sphaerospermum is a radiotrophic fungus belonging to the genus Cladosporium and was described in 1882 by Albert Julius Otto Penzig from the decaying leaves and branches of Citrus. It is a dematiaceous (darkly-pigmented) fungus characterized by slow growth and largely asexual reproduction. Cladosporium sphaerospermum consists of a complex of poorly morphologically differentiated "cryptic" species that share many physiological and ecological attributes. In older literature, all of these sibling species were classified as C. sphaerospermum despite their unique nature. Accordingly, there is confusion in older literature reports on the physiological and habitat regularities of C. sphaerospermum in the strict sense. This fungus is most phylogenetically similar to C. fusiforme. According to modern phylogenetic analyses, the previously synonymized species, Cladosporium langeroni, is a distinct species.

== Growth and morphology ==
The hyphae of Cladosporium sphaerospermum are thick walled, septate, and olivaceous-brown in colour. Colonies of the fungus are velvety in texture and flattened (i.e., rarely raised, fluffy, or radially furrowed). C. sphaerospermum conidiophores are branched, septate, and dark, up to 150–300 μm long and 3.5–4.0 μm wide. The structure of the conidiophores are tree-like, a prominent feature of the genus Cladosporium. Unlike other related species, the conidiophores of this species lack swollen nodes at the branching points. Conidia of this species are characteristically globose to ellipsoid with a diameter of 3.4–4.0 μm. The conidia are formed in branching chains in which the youngest conidium is situated at the top. Cladosporium sphaerospermum also produces ramoconidia 6–14 × 3.5–4.0 μm in length and this feature can be used as a method of distinguishing between similar species. Ramoconidia are conidia found at the branching points joining multiple spore chains and can be recognized by one end having a single attachment scar and the other end having two or more attachment scars. Cladosporium sphaerospermum is also a psychrophilic fungus, known to grow at temperatures as low as −5 °C (23 °F) with an upper limit of 35 °C (95 °F) and no growth at 37 °C (99 °F). The optimal temperature this fungus grows under is 25 °C (77 °F). This fungus is xerotolerant as it can thrive in environments with low water activity caused by high salinity (halotolerant) or other dissolved solutes. This fungus has been observed to grow in as low as 0.815 a_{w} (water activity) in vitro.

== Physiology ==
Cladosporium sphaerospermum is considered a saprotroph and is a secondary invader of dead or dying plant tissue. Energy is provided through the conversion of starch, cellulose, and sucrose to alcohol and carbon dioxide. However, it has been shown in a laboratory environment that these fungi are able to successfully grow with toluene as the sole source of carbon. This trait may have arisen because these fungi and many others from the genus Cladosporium are secondary colonizers and frequently dwell in environments poor in nutrients. Cladosporium sphaerospermum is able to enhance polycyclic aromatic hydrocarbon biodegradation in soils due to reactive oxygen species produced as secondary metabolites, such as H_{2}O_{2}. This species is a prolific producer of the pigmented secondary metabolite, melanin, thought to serve as a protective mechanism against UV irradiation, enzymatic lysis, oxidant attack, and fungal infections from other competing fungi. A method that can be used to determine the presence of this fungus on a background of other organic material is through the KOH test which stains the fungus. The addition of lactophenol blue with this test turns the chitin in the cell wall blue but leaves the budding conidia and globular conidiophores with their characteristic brown colouring. The first draft sequence of the C. sphaerospermum genome was created in 2012. Genes were identified that are involved in the dihydroxynaphthalene (DHN)-melanin biosynthesis pathway which confirms the etiology of melanin in this species. Genes associated with the production of allergens were also identified as well as those conferring resistance to various antifungal drugs.

=== Habitat and ecology ===
Cladosporium sphaerospermum is a cosmopolitan fungus that inhabits city buildings and the environment and because of its airborne nature it can move rapidly between locations, though the extent of this is lacking in research. It is found in hypersaline environments in Mediterranean and tropical climates, as well as soil and plant environments in temperate climates. The indoor presence of this fungus can signify there is a condensation problem within the building such as on bathroom walls and in kitchens. Cladosporium sphaerospermum has also been shown to inhabit paint films on walls and other surfaces as well as old paintings. This fungus is also able to grow on gypsum-based material with and without paint and wallpaper. Plant materials that are affected include citrus leaves and various other decaying plant leaves, on the stems of herbaceous and woody plants, on fruits and vegetables. The fungus has also been reported from wheat-based bakery items.

== Human health ==
Cladosporium sphaerospermum is mainly known as a spoilage agent of harvested fruits and vegetables. There are very few reports implicating this species as a disease agent in humans. It is known as an allergen and mainly causes problems in patients with respiratory tract diseases as well as subcutaneous phaeohyphomycosis and intrabronchial lesions in immunocompetent individuals caused by many dematiaceous fungi. It has been reported rarely from skin, eye, sinus, and brain infections. There has been one reported case in which a female patient developed swelling on the dorsum of her hand which, after testing with Grocott's methenamine silver stain and lactophenol cotton blue, confirmed the presence of dematiaceous hyphae compatible with C. sphaerospermum. Another case involved cerebral phaeohyphomycosis but this was treated successfully and the symptoms were abated. Cladosporium sphaerospermum produces allergenic compounds but is not known to produce significant mycotoxins.

=== Plant growth stimulant ===
In 2020, the U.S. Department of Agriculture announced it had found evidence that a certain strain of the fungus has a positive effect on plant growth. In a study using tobacco and pepper plants, they found that "Cladosporium sphaerospermum strain TC09 [...] can dramatically accelerate plant growth if a germinating plant is near the fungus as it emits volatiles or gases."

=== Protection against radiation ===
After finding that the fungus is thriving at high radiation levels within the Chernobyl nuclear plant after the Chernobyl disaster, an experiment was made at the International Space Station in December 2018 and January 2019 to test whether radiotrophic fungi could be used as protection against radiation, especially in space. The experiment used Cladosporium sphaerospermum. Results were prepublished for peer-review in July 2020. During the 30 day study the amount of radiation reduction beneath a 1.7 mm thick layer of fungus at full maturity was measured to be 2.17±0.35%. Estimates of a 232 cm thick layer of the fungus indicate it could attenuate the annual dose from the radiation on the surface of Mars.
