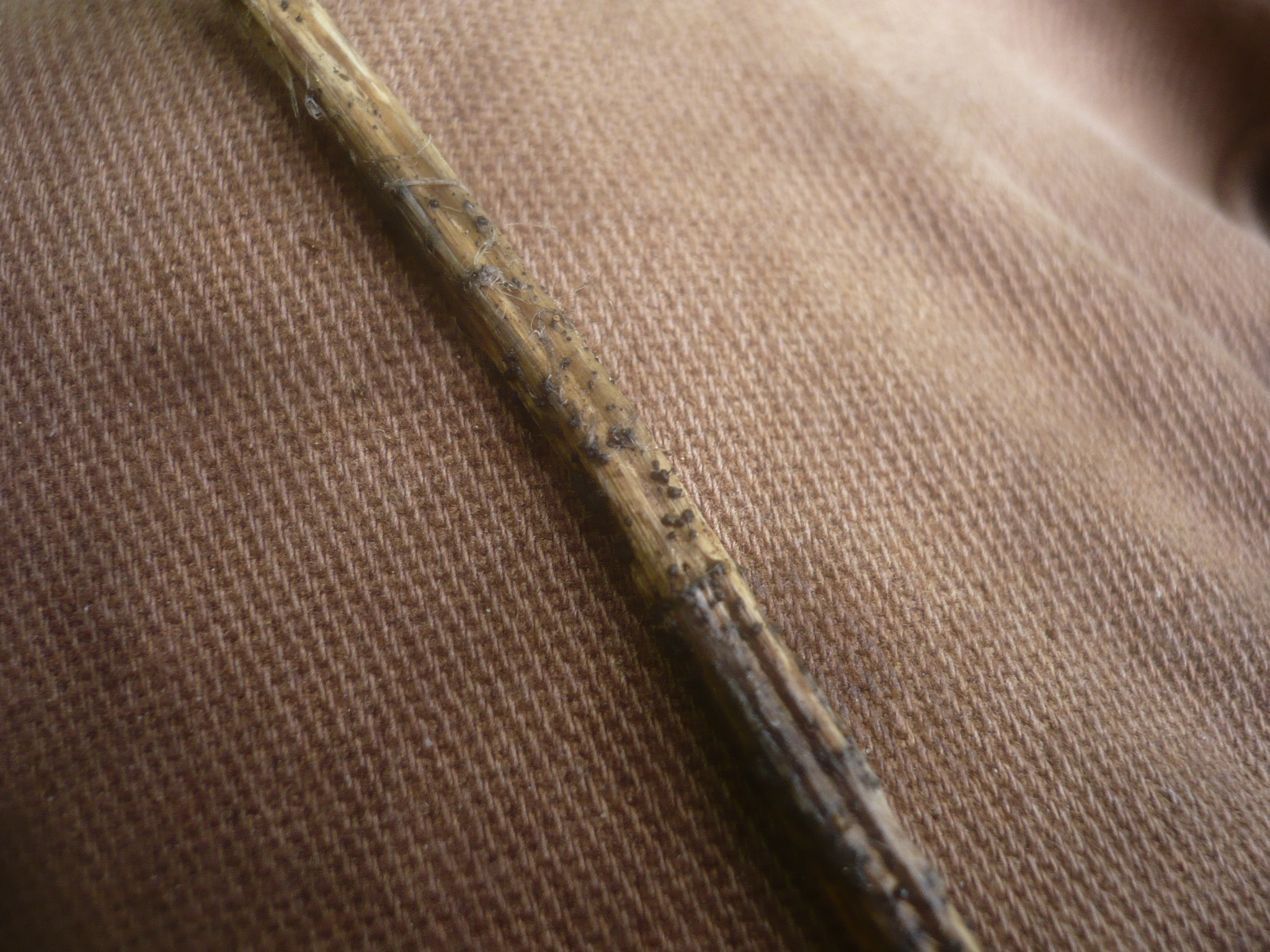
- Leptosphaeria acuta

Scientific classification
- Kingdom: Fungi
- Division: Ascomycota
- Class: Dothideomycetes
- Order: Pleosporales
- Family: Leptosphaeriaceae
- Genus: Leptosphaeria; Ces. & De Not. (1863)

Type species
- Leptosphaeria doliolum (Pers.) Ces. & De Not. 1863

Species
- see text

Synonyms
- Bilimbiospora Auersw. 1861; Myriocarpium Bonord. 1864; Ampullina Quél. 1875; Ocellularia sect. Phyllophthalmaria Müll. Arg. 1883; Scoleciasis Roum. & Fautrey 1889; Scleroderris subgen. Phaeoderris Sacc. 1889; Macrobasis Starbäck 1893; Baumiella Henn. 1903; Dothideopsella Höhn. 1915; Sclerodothis Höhn. 1918; Leptosporopsis Höhn. 1920; Exilispora Tehon & E.Y.Daniels 1927; Dendroleptosphaeria Sousa da Câmara 1932; Humboldtina Chardón & Toro 1934

= Leptosphaeria =

Genus of fungi

Leptosphaeria is a genus of fungi in the family Phaeosphaeriaceae.

The genus has a cosmopolitan distribution worldwide.

== Species ==
As of 2023 August 10, the GBIF lists up to 700 species, while Species Fungorum lists about 1112 species (with many former species included).

- Leptosphaeria abbreviata
- Leptosphaeria abuensis
- Leptosphaeria abutilonis
- Leptosphaeria aceris
- Leptosphaeria acheniorum
- Leptosphaeria acuta
- Leptosphaeria acutispora
- Leptosphaeria acutiuscula
- Leptosphaeria adesmicola
- Leptosphaeria agaves
- Leptosphaeria aggregata
- Leptosphaeria ahmadii
- Leptosphaeria akagiensis
- Leptosphaeria albopunctata
- Leptosphaeria albulae
- Leptosphaeria alexandrinis
- Leptosphaeria algarbiensis
- Leptosphaeria alhagi
- Leptosphaeria aliena
- Leptosphaeria allorgei
- Leptosphaeria almeidae
- Leptosphaeria almeidana
- Leptosphaeria aloes
- Leptosphaeria alopecuri
- Leptosphaeria alpiniae
- Leptosphaeria ambiens
- Leptosphaeria ammothamni
- Leptosphaeria amorphae
- Leptosphaeria ampelina
- Leptosphaeria anacycli
- Leptosphaeria anarrhini
- Leptosphaeria anceps
- Leptosphaeria andrijevicensis
- Leptosphaeria anemones
- Leptosphaeria anisomeres
- Leptosphaeria antherici
- Leptosphaeria apios
- Leptosphaeria apios-fortunei
- Leptosphaeria apocyni
- Leptosphaeria aquatica
- Leptosphaeria aquilariae
- Leptosphaeria arbuti
- Leptosphaeria arctalaskana
- Leptosphaeria arecae
- Leptosphaeria arnoldii
- Leptosphaeria artemisiae
- Leptosphaeria arthrophyma
- Leptosphaeria arunci
- Leptosphaeria asclepiadis
- Leptosphaeria asparagi
- Leptosphaeria aspidistrae
- Leptosphaeria astericola
- Leptosphaeria asteris
- Leptosphaeria atraphaxis
- Leptosphaeria atriplicis
- Leptosphaeria atropurpurea
- Leptosphaeria auerswaldii
- Leptosphaeria australiensis
- Leptosphaeria avenaria
- Leptosphaeria avicenniae
- Leptosphaeria bacillifera
- Leptosphaeria baggei
- Leptosphaeria balcarica
- Leptosphaeria baldratiana
- Leptosphaeria ballotae
- Leptosphaeria bambusicola
- Leptosphaeria bardanae
- Leptosphaeria barriae
- Leptosphaeria basalduai
- Leptosphaeria batumensis
- Leptosphaeria baumii
- Leptosphaeria belamcadae
- Leptosphaeria bellynckii
- Leptosphaeria berberidicola
- Leptosphaeria biebersteinii
- Leptosphaeria bispora
- Leptosphaeria blumeri
- Leptosphaeria bomareae
- Leptosphaeria bondari
- Leptosphaeria bondarii
- Leptosphaeria bornmuelleri
- Leptosphaeria borziana
- Leptosphaeria braunii
- Leptosphaeria bresadolana
- Leptosphaeria brightonensis
- Leptosphaeria bubakii
- Leptosphaeria buddlejae
- Leptosphaeria bulgarica
- Leptosphaeria buxina
- Leptosphaeria byssincola
- Leptosphaeria caballeroi
- Leptosphaeria cacuminispora
- Leptosphaeria caespitosa
- Leptosphaeria calligoni
- Leptosphaeria calopogonii
- Leptosphaeria calvescens
- Leptosphaeria camelliae-japonicae
- Leptosphaeria camphorosmae
- Leptosphaeria canephorae
- Leptosphaeria cannabina
- Leptosphaeria caricis-vulpinae
- Leptosphaeria carlinoides
- Leptosphaeria carneomaculans
- Leptosphaeria casta
- Leptosphaeria castagnei
- Leptosphaeria castillejae
- Leptosphaeria castrensis
- Leptosphaeria catalaunica
- Leptosphaeria caucana
- Leptosphaeria cavanillesii
- Leptosphaeria cavarae
- Leptosphaeria ceballosi
- Leptosphaeria cecropiae
- Leptosphaeria cephalariae-uralensis
- Leptosphaeria cerastii
- Leptosphaeria cercocarpi
- Leptosphaeria cerei-peruviani
- Leptosphaeria cesatiana
- Leptosphaeria chamaeropis
- Leptosphaeria chenopodii-albi
- Leptosphaeria chilensis
- Leptosphaeria chochrjakovii
- Leptosphaeria chusqueae
- Leptosphaeria cinnamomi
- Leptosphaeria cirsii-arvensis
- Leptosphaeria cisticola
- Leptosphaeria cistina
- Leptosphaeria clara
- Leptosphaeria clarkii
- Leptosphaeria clavata
- Leptosphaeria clavispora
- Leptosphaeria clematidicola
- Leptosphaeria clerodendri
- Leptosphaeria coccothrinacis
- Leptosphaeria cocoës
- Leptosphaeria coffaeicida
- Leptosphaeria coffeigena
- Leptosphaeria coleosanthi
- Leptosphaeria colocasiae
- Leptosphaeria compressa
- Leptosphaeria conii
- Leptosphaeria coniigena
- Leptosphaeria coniigera
- Leptosphaeria coniothyrium
- Leptosphaeria contecta
- Leptosphaeria cookei
- Leptosphaeria coorgica
- Leptosphaeria cordylines
- Leptosphaeria cornuta
- Leptosphaeria coronillae
- Leptosphaeria corrugans
- Leptosphaeria cosmicola
- Leptosphaeria coumarounae
- Leptosphaeria crozalsiana
- Leptosphaeria crozalsii
- Leptosphaeria cruchetii
- Leptosphaeria cruenta
- Leptosphaeria cryptica
- Leptosphaeria culmicola
- Leptosphaeria culmifraga
- Leptosphaeria cycadis
- Leptosphaeria cylindrostoma
- Leptosphaeria cynodontis-dactyli
- Leptosphaeria cynosuri
- Leptosphaeria cyperi
- Leptosphaeria cypericola
- Leptosphaeria daphnes
- Leptosphaeria daphniphylli
- Leptosphaeria darkeri
- Leptosphaeria davidii
- Leptosphaeria daviesiae
- Leptosphaeria davisiana
- Leptosphaeria dearnessii
- Leptosphaeria deficiens
- Leptosphaeria dematiicola
- Leptosphaeria densa
- Leptosphaeria derasa
- Leptosphaeria desciscens
- Leptosphaeria desmodii
- Leptosphaeria dianthi
- Leptosphaeria dichosciadii
- Leptosphaeria didymellae-vincetoxici
- Leptosphaeria dioica
- Leptosphaeria dobrogica
- Leptosphaeria dodonaeae
- Leptosphaeria doliolum
- Leptosphaeria dracaenae
- Leptosphaeria draconis
- Leptosphaeria drechsleri
- Leptosphaeria dryadis
- Leptosphaeria dumetorum
- Leptosphaeria duplex
- Leptosphaeria echiella
- Leptosphaeria eichhorniae
- Leptosphaeria elaeidicola
- Leptosphaeria elaoudi
- Leptosphaeria empetri
- Leptosphaeria ephedrae
- Leptosphaeria epicarecta
- Leptosphaeria epilobii
- Leptosphaeria equiseticola
- Leptosphaeria eremophila
- Leptosphaeria eriobotryae
- Leptosphaeria errabunda
- Leptosphaeria erythrinae
- Leptosphaeria espeletiae
- Leptosphaeria etheridgei
- Leptosphaeria eumorpha
- Leptosphaeria eustoma
- Leptosphaeria eustomoides
- Leptosphaeria exocarpogena
- Leptosphaeria fallax
- Leptosphaeria faullii
- Leptosphaeria feltgenii
- Leptosphaeria ferruginea
- Leptosphaeria fibrincola
- Leptosphaeria fici-elasticae
- Leptosphaeria flotoviae
- Leptosphaeria foeniculi
- Leptosphaeria foliicola
- Leptosphaeria folliculata
- Leptosphaeria francoae
- Leptosphaeria fraserae
- Leptosphaeria frigida
- Leptosphaeria frondis
- Leptosphaeria fuscella
- Leptosphaeria fusispora
- Leptosphaeria galeobdolonis
- Leptosphaeria galeopsidicola
- Leptosphaeria galii-silvatici
- Leptosphaeria galiorum
- Leptosphaeria galligena
- Leptosphaeria gaubae
- Leptosphaeria gaultheriae
- Leptosphaeria geasteris
- Leptosphaeria genistae
- Leptosphaeria georgius-fischeri
- Leptosphaeria ginimia
- Leptosphaeria ginkgo
- Leptosphaeria glandulosae
- Leptosphaeria gloeospora
- Leptosphaeria glyceriae
- Leptosphaeria gossypii
- Leptosphaeria gratissima
- Leptosphaeria grignonnensis
- Leptosphaeria grisea
- Leptosphaeria grossulariae
- Leptosphaeria guazumae
- Leptosphaeria guiyan
- Leptosphaeria gymnosporiae-rothianae
- Leptosphaeria haematites
- Leptosphaeria haloxyli
- Leptosphaeria hamamelidis
- Leptosphaeria hardenbergiae
- Leptosphaeria hazslinszkii
- Leptosphaeria helminthospora
- Leptosphaeria helvetica
- Leptosphaeria hemicrypta
- Leptosphaeria hesperia
- Leptosphaeria hesperidicola
- Leptosphaeria heterospora
- Leptosphaeria heufleri
- Leptosphaeria heveae
- Leptosphaeria hispanica
- Leptosphaeria hollosiana
- Leptosphaeria hollosii
- Leptosphaeria holmii
- Leptosphaeria holmiorum
- Leptosphaeria holmskjoldii
- Leptosphaeria honiaraensis
- Leptosphaeria hordei
- Leptosphaeria hormodactyli
- Leptosphaeria hottai
- Leptosphaeria houseana
- Leptosphaeria hrubyana
- Leptosphaeria hurae
- Leptosphaeria huthiana
- Leptosphaeria hyalina
- Leptosphaeria hydrangeae
- Leptosphaeria hydrophila
- Leptosphaeria hymenaeae
- Leptosphaeria hyparrheniae
- Leptosphaeria hypericicola
- Leptosphaeria icositana
- Leptosphaeria inarensis
- Leptosphaeria incruenta
- Leptosphaeria indica
- Leptosphaeria inecola
- Leptosphaeria inquinans
- Leptosphaeria insulana
- Leptosphaeria iridis
- Leptosphaeria isocellula
- Leptosphaeria italica
- Leptosphaeria iwamotoi
- Leptosphaeria jacksonensis
- Leptosphaeria jacksonii
- Leptosphaeria johansonii
- Leptosphaeria jubaeae
- Leptosphaeria junci
- Leptosphaeria junci-acuti
- Leptosphaeria junci-glauci
- Leptosphaeria junciseda
- Leptosphaeria kerguelensis
- Leptosphaeria kochiana
- Leptosphaeria kotschyana
- Leptosphaeria kuangfuensis
- Leptosphaeria ladina
- Leptosphaeria lagenoides
- Leptosphaeria larvalis
- Leptosphaeria lassenensis
- Leptosphaeria lauri
- Leptosphaeria lavandulae
- Leptosphaeria lecanora
- Leptosphaeria leersiae
- Leptosphaeria lelebae
- Leptosphaeria lespedezae
- Leptosphaeria leucadendri
- Leptosphaeria libanotis
- Leptosphaeria linearis
- Leptosphaeria lingue
- Leptosphaeria lithophilae
- Leptosphaeria littoralis
- Leptosphaeria livida
- Leptosphaeria lobeliae
- Leptosphaeria lolii
- Leptosphaeria longan
- Leptosphaeria longipedicellata
- Leptosphaeria longispora
- Leptosphaeria lonicerae
- Leptosphaeria lonicerina
- Leptosphaeria lucina
- Leptosphaeria lunariae
- Leptosphaeria lupinicola
- Leptosphaeria lusitanica
- Leptosphaeria luxemburgensis
- Leptosphaeria lyciophila
- Leptosphaeria lyndonvillae
- Leptosphaeria lythri
- Leptosphaeria macounii
- Leptosphaeria macrocapsa
- Leptosphaeria macrochloae
- Leptosphaeria macromodesta
- Leptosphaeria macrosporoides
- Leptosphaeria maculans
- Leptosphaeria maderensis
- Leptosphaeria magnoliae
- Leptosphaeria major
- Leptosphaeria malojensis
- Leptosphaeria malyi
- Leptosphaeria mandshurica
- Leptosphaeria marantae
- Leptosphaeria marina
- Leptosphaeria martagoni
- Leptosphaeria matisiae
- Leptosphaeria matritensis
- Leptosphaeria maydis
- Leptosphaeria media
- Leptosphaeria medicaginicola
- Leptosphaeria megalotheca
- Leptosphaeria meliloti
- Leptosphaeria mellispora
- Leptosphaeria mendozana
- Leptosphaeria menthae
- Leptosphaeria meomaritima
- Leptosphaeria metasequoiae
- Leptosphaeria microthyrioides
- Leptosphaeria mikaniae
- Leptosphaeria millefolii
- Leptosphaeria modesta
- Leptosphaeria montana
- Leptosphaeria morierae
- Leptosphaeria morindae
- Leptosphaeria moutan
- Leptosphaeria moutoniana
- Leptosphaeria mucosa
- Leptosphaeria muirensis
- Leptosphaeria multiseptata
- Leptosphaeria musae
- Leptosphaeria muscari
- Leptosphaeria musicola
- Leptosphaeria musigena
- Leptosphaeria myricae
- Leptosphaeria myrti
- Leptosphaeria myrticola
- Leptosphaeria mysorensis
- Leptosphaeria nanae
- Leptosphaeria nandinae
- Leptosphaeria napelli
- Leptosphaeria nashi
- Leptosphaeria nectrioides
- Leptosphaeria nesodes
- Leptosphaeria nigrificans
- Leptosphaeria nigromaculata
- Leptosphaeria norvegica
- Leptosphaeria noveboracensis
- Leptosphaeria nypicola
- Leptosphaeria obesa
- Leptosphaeria octophragmia
- Leptosphaeria ogilviensis
- Leptosphaeria onagrae
- Leptosphaeria onobrychidicola
- Leptosphaeria onobrychidis
- Leptosphaeria orae-maris
- Leptosphaeria ornithogali
- Leptosphaeria orthrosanthi
- Leptosphaeria oryzicola
- Leptosphaeria oryzina
- Leptosphaeria pachytheca
- Leptosphaeria pacifica
- Leptosphaeria pampaniniana
- Leptosphaeria pandani
- Leptosphaeria pandanicola
- Leptosphaeria paoluccii
- Leptosphaeria papaveris
- Leptosphaeria papillata
- Leptosphaeria papillosa
- Leptosphaeria paraguariensis
- Leptosphaeria parmeliarum
- Leptosphaeria pedicularis
- Leptosphaeria pelagica
- Leptosphaeria pelargonii
- Leptosphaeria penniseti
- Leptosphaeria penniseticola
- Leptosphaeria periclymeni
- Leptosphaeria perplexa
- Leptosphaeria peruviana
- Leptosphaeria petiolaris
- Leptosphaeria petrakii
- Leptosphaeria petri
- Leptosphaeria phacae
- Leptosphaeria phlogis
- Leptosphaeria phoenicis
- Leptosphaeria phoenix
- Leptosphaeria phormii
- Leptosphaeria phyllachoricola
- Leptosphaeria phyllachorivira
- Leptosphaeria phyllostachydis
- Leptosphaeria physostegiae
- Leptosphaeria pilulariae
- Leptosphaeria pini
- Leptosphaeria planiuscula
- Leptosphaeria platanicola
- Leptosphaeria platychorae
- Leptosphaeria platypus
- Leptosphaeria plectrospora
- Leptosphaeria plocamae
- Leptosphaeria plurisepta
- Leptosphaeria polini
- Leptosphaeria politis
- Leptosphaeria polygonati
- Leptosphaeria polylepidis
- Leptosphaeria polytrichina
- Leptosphaeria porellae
- Leptosphaeria portoricensis
- Leptosphaeria praeandina
- Leptosphaeria praeclara
- Leptosphaeria pratensis
- Leptosphaeria priuscheggiana
- Leptosphaeria proteicola
- Leptosphaeria protousneae
- Leptosphaeria pruni
- Leptosphaeria pseudodiaporthe
- Leptosphaeria pseudohleria
- Leptosphaeria pterocelastri
- Leptosphaeria punicae
- Leptosphaeria punjabensis
- Leptosphaeria purpurea
- Leptosphaeria pusilla
- Leptosphaeria puttemansii
- Leptosphaeria pycnostigma
- Leptosphaeria quamoclidii
- Leptosphaeria rajasthanensis
- Leptosphaeria ramsaugiensis
- Leptosphaeria ranunculi-polyanthemi
- Leptosphaeria ranunculoides
- Leptosphaeria raphani
- Leptosphaeria recutita
- Leptosphaeria rehmii
- Leptosphaeria reidiana
- Leptosphaeria restionis
- Leptosphaeria rhodiolicola
- Leptosphaeria rhopographoides
- Leptosphaeria riofrioi
- Leptosphaeria rivalis
- Leptosphaeria rivularis
- Leptosphaeria robusta
- Leptosphaeria rostrata
- Leptosphaeria rostrupii
- Leptosphaeria rubefaciens
- Leptosphaeria rubella
- Leptosphaeria rubicunda
- Leptosphaeria rugosa
- Leptosphaeria rulingiae
- Leptosphaeria rumicicola
- Leptosphaeria rusci
- Leptosphaeria ruscicola
- Leptosphaeria russellii
- Leptosphaeria ruthenica
- Leptosphaeria saccharicola
- Leptosphaeria salicaria
- Leptosphaeria salviae
- Leptosphaeria schefflerae
- Leptosphaeria schneideriana
- Leptosphaeria schoenocauli
- Leptosphaeria scitula
- Leptosphaeria sclerotioides
- Leptosphaeria scolecosporarum
- Leptosphaeria scutati
- Leptosphaeria secalina
- Leptosphaeria semelina
- Leptosphaeria senegalensis
- Leptosphaeria sepalorum
- Leptosphaeria septemcellulata
- Leptosphaeria septovariata
- Leptosphaeria shahvarica
- Leptosphaeria shastensis
- Leptosphaeria sibthorpii
- Leptosphaeria sieversiae
- Leptosphaeria sileris
- Leptosphaeria silvestris
- Leptosphaeria simillima
- Leptosphaeria simmonsii
- Leptosphaeria sinapis
- Leptosphaeria smarodsii
- Leptosphaeria solani
- Leptosphaeria solanicola
- Leptosphaeria solheimii
- Leptosphaeria sophorae
- Leptosphaeria sorbi
- Leptosphaeria sparganii
- Leptosphaeria sparti
- Leptosphaeria spegazzinii
- Leptosphaeria staritzii
- Leptosphaeria staticicola
- Leptosphaeria sticta
- Leptosphaeria stipae-minor
- Leptosphaeria stratiotis
- Leptosphaeria striolata
- Leptosphaeria suaedae
- Leptosphaeria subarticulata
- Leptosphaeria subcompressa
- Leptosphaeria submaculans
- Leptosphaeria subriparia
- Leptosphaeria substerilis
- Leptosphaeria suffulta
- Leptosphaeria surculorum
- Leptosphaeria swertiae
- Leptosphaeria sydowii
- Leptosphaeria taichungensis
- Leptosphaeria tamaricis
- Leptosphaeria tami
- Leptosphaeria taurica
- Leptosphaeria telopeae
- Leptosphaeria tenuis
- Leptosphaeria tetonensis
- Leptosphaeria thalictricola
- Leptosphaeria thalictrina
- Leptosphaeria themedicola
- Leptosphaeria theobromicola
- Leptosphaeria thujicola
- Leptosphaeria tigrisoides
- Leptosphaeria tiroliensis
- Leptosphaeria tolgorensis
- Leptosphaeria tollens
- Leptosphaeria tompkinsii
- Leptosphaeria tonduzii
- Leptosphaeria torbolensis
- Leptosphaeria tornatospora
- Leptosphaeria torrendii
- Leptosphaeria trematostoma
- Leptosphaeria trevoae
- Leptosphaeria trichopterygis
- Leptosphaeria trifolii
- Leptosphaeria trifolii-alpestris
- Leptosphaeria trollii
- Leptosphaeria tungurahuensis
- Leptosphaeria tupae
- Leptosphaeria ucrainica
- Leptosphaeria uliginosa
- Leptosphaeria ulmicola
- Leptosphaeria usneae
- Leptosphaeria vagabunda
- Leptosphaeria valdiviensis
- Leptosphaeria valdobbiae
- Leptosphaeria valesiaca
- Leptosphaeria variabilis
- Leptosphaeria variegata
- Leptosphaeria veratri
- Leptosphaeria veronicae
- Leptosphaeria verwoerdiana
- Leptosphaeria viciae
- Leptosphaeria vindobonensis
- Leptosphaeria vitensis
- Leptosphaeria vrieseae
- Leptosphaeria waghorniana
- Leptosphaeria wehmeyeri
- Leptosphaeria weimeri
- Leptosphaeria williamsii
- Leptosphaeria woodrowi-wilsoni
- Leptosphaeria woroninii
- Leptosphaeria xylogena
- Leptosphaeria yerbae
- Leptosphaeria zahlbruckneri
- Leptosphaeria zeae
- Leptosphaeria zeae-maydis
- Leptosphaeria zeicola
- Leptosphaeria zingiberis
- Leptosphaeria zizaniivora
