= Cladosporium psychrotolerans =

Scientific classification
- Kingdom: Fungi
- Division: Ascomycota
- Class: Dothideomycetes
- Order: Cladosporiales
- Family: Cladosporiaceae
- Genus: Cladosporium
- Species: C. psychrotolerans

Binomial name
- Cladosporium psychrotolerans Zalar, de Hoog, Schroers, Crous, Groenewald & Gunde-Cimerman (2007)

Species of fungus

Cladosporium psychrotolerans is a fungus found in hypersaline environments. It grows well at 4 °C but not at 30 °C, and has ornamented, globoid conidia with long digitate projections.
