= Leptosphaeria woroninii =

Scientific classification
- Kingdom: Fungi
- Division: Ascomycota
- Class: Dothideomycetes
- Order: Pleosporales
- Family: Leptosphaeriaceae
- Genus: Leptosphaeria
- Species: L. woroninii

Binomial name
- Leptosphaeria woroninii Docea & Negru (1972)

Species of fungus

Leptosphaeria woroninii is a plant pathogen.
