= Cylindrosporium juglandis =

Scientific classification
- Kingdom: Fungi
- Division: Ascomycota
- Class: Leotiomycetes
- Order: Helotiales
- Family: Ploettnerulaceae
- Genus: Cylindrosporium
- Species: C. juglandis

Binomial name
- Cylindrosporium juglandis F.A. Wolf, (1914)

Species of fungus

Cylindrosporium juglandis is a fungus in the order of Helotiales and a plant pathogen.
