= Cladosporium spinulosum =

Scientific classification
- Kingdom: Fungi
- Division: Ascomycota
- Class: Dothideomycetes
- Order: Cladosporiales
- Family: Cladosporiaceae
- Genus: Cladosporium
- Species: C. spinulosum

Binomial name
- Cladosporium spinulosum Zalar, de Hoog, Schroers, Crous, Groenewald & Gunde-Cimerman (2007)

Species of fungus

Cladosporium spinulosum is a fungus found in hypersaline environments. It has spherical, ornamented conidia with long digitate (finger-like) projections.
