= Graphiopsis =

Scientific classification
- Domain: Eukaryota
- Kingdom: Fungi
- Division: Ascomycota
- Class: Dothideomycetes
- Order: Capnodiales
- Family: Davidiellaceae
- Genus: Graphiopsis; Trail, 1889

Genus of fungi

Graphiopsis is a genus of fungi belonging to the family Davidiellaceae.

The species of this genus are found in Europe, Japan, Northern America and New Zealand.

Species:

- Graphiopsis ceratostomoides (Speg.) Goid.
- Graphiopsis chlorocephala (Fresen.) Trail
- Graphiopsis desmazieri (Sacc.) Höhn.
- Graphiopsis sacchari (Speg.) Goid.
- Graphiopsis verticillata (Speg.) Goid.
