= Cladosporium ear rot =

Disease that affects maize

Cladosporium ear rot is a disease that affects maize. The disease is caused by the saprophytic fungus Cladosporium herbarum and is characterized by black or dark green fungal growths that cause black streaks on kernels.

== Hosts and Symptoms ==
C. herbarum's main host is maize. Although there is usually little structural damage caused to the ears, the following symptoms are obvious during inspection:

- grey to black or very dark green blotched or streaked fuzzy/powdery/sooty appearing spores on the kernels and in between them
- black streaks and blotches start near the tips of kernels and develop towards the crown
- advanced, fully colonized ears are dark and lightweight

Plants that have poor husk coverage and weak seed coats allow for more frequent infection. Other factors that contribute to more infections are air currents that transport spores and an increase in vectors, including humans.

The color of the fungal growth can be used to tell the various ear rots apart. For example, Cladosporium ear rot looks similar to Trichoderma ear rot, but Trichoderma ear rot has a more intense green color. Microscopic examination is needed to tell the difference for sure.

== Environment ==
Environmental conditions that favor the infection and growth of Cladosporium herbarum are typical for most fungi, such as high moisture, correct temperature, low air flow, and neutral pH. Moisture is required for mold growth to occur, which is why C. herbarum's growth is strongly correlated with heavy rainfall in July, August, and September. Specifically, kernel moistures at or above 18% favor ear mold growth. Most of the fungal growth on ears and kernels occurs during the period of silking to harvest. Delayed harvest and delayed dry down in fields also gives the fungus more time to spread on the kernels and ears. Cool temperatures can slow, but not completely stop, fungal growth.

Since C. herbarum isn't capable of penetrating its host on its own, it needs openings to get inside the plant, which are most commonly seen in stressed, frosted, or prematurely ripened plants. In particular, an early frost gives the best chance for early infection and colonization of cracked kernels due to the increased time to spread as the plant matures. Cracks in kernels can also be caused by natural growth, hail damage, or other insects and animals such as corn earworms, European corn borers, and birds. The fungus overseasons in crop residues, on the soil surface, or in stored grain. Grain in storage is also susceptible to fungal growth in the same conditions as those that favor growth while in the field.

== Management ==
One of the most effective ways of managing Cladosporium ear rot is to identify its presence as early as possible and to manage the environment that the corn is grown and stored in. Scouting fields for ear rots, which should be done every two weeks, and testing for mycotoxin contamination is the first step in assessing whether or not ear rots in general are present, although no mycotoxin is associated with C. herbarum specifically. Problem fields can be characterized by having greater than 10% of ears that contain the fungus on 10-20% of the grain. Infected cobs should be harvested as soon as possible, cleaned to remove fungal particles, dried to 15% moisture or lower immediately to stop fungal growth, and stored in an aerated environment at 13-14% moisture between 35 and 40 °F to stop the asexual reproduction and spread of the fungus. These cultural controls can greatly decrease yield loss.

C. herbarum needs an opening to infect its host, so cultural controls that prevent kernels from getting wounded would prevent infection of new plants. Insecticides can be used timely to chemically control corn earworms and European corn borers that damage kernels, allowing for inoculum to get inside. Also, combines should be sanitized and properly adjusted to minimize damage to kernels during harvest.

Another less effective way to manage what percentage of the crop is infected is by planting resistant varieties and discarding the most susceptible ones. However, it is worth mentioning that no hybrid is resistant to all ear-rotting fungi and resistant varieties aren't widely available so even though a strain may be resistant to Cladosporium ear rot, it may be at risk of infection by another ear-rotting fungus. More husk coverage and stronger seed coats also make the host harder to infect in the first place. Crop rotation would likely be an effective cultural control method of eliminating the pathogen, but it would require all corn growers in a county to comply in order for there to be any significant impact on inoculum levels. If all corn growers weren't in sync with the crop rotations, spores from nearby fields would simply be carried by wind into other fields and keep inoculum levels from dropping to reasonable levels.

== Other effects ==
C. herbarum is also a common human allergen.
