= Leptosphaeria cannabina =

Scientific classification
- Kingdom: Fungi
- Division: Ascomycota
- Class: Dothideomycetes
- Order: Pleosporales
- Family: Leptosphaeriaceae
- Genus: Leptosphaeria
- Species: L. cannabina

Binomial name
- Leptosphaeria cannabina Ferraris & Massa

Species of fungus

Leptosphaeria cannabina is a fungal plant pathogen that affects cannabis.
