= Cladosporium arthropodii =

Scientific classification
- Kingdom: Fungi
- Division: Ascomycota
- Class: Dothideomycetes
- Order: Cladosporiales
- Family: Cladosporiaceae
- Genus: Cladosporium
- Species: C. arthropodii

Binomial name
- Cladosporium arthropodii Braun, Hill & Schubert (2006)

Species of fungus

Cladosporium arthropodii is a fungus. It was discovered between 2005 and 2007 and recorded as potentially endemic to New Zealand in the Country Report of New Zealand issued by the Asia and Pacific Plant Protection Organization. It was recorded as using Arthropodium cirratum (the rengarenga plant) as a host.

== Sources ==
- Asia and Pacific Plant Protection Organization, Country Report of New Zealand, August 2007
