= Cladosporium herbarum =

Scientific classification
- Domain: Eukaryota
- Kingdom: Fungi
- Division: Ascomycota
- Class: Dothideomycetes
- Order: Capnodiales
- Family: Davidiellaceae
- Genus: Cladosporium
- Species: C. herbarum

Binomial name
- Cladosporium herbarum (Pers.) Link (1816)

Synonyms
- Byssus herbarum (Pers.) de Candolle & Lamarck (1815); Dematium herbarum Pers. (1794); Heterosporium epimyces Cooke & Massee (1883)

Species of fungus

Cladosporium herbarum is a common fungus found worldwide in organic and inorganic matter. It is efficiently distributed in the air, where it exists as the most frequently occurring fungal species. It can grow over a wide range of temperatures including very cold environments, giving it the ability to grow on refrigerated meat and form "black spots". Its high prevalence in the air and production of allergens makes C. herbarum an important exacerbant of asthma and hay fever.

== Prevalence ==
Cladosporium herbarum is the type species of the genus Cladosporium. Its spores are highly prevalent in the air; the genus Cladosporium is the dominant genus of spores found in the air, with the C. herbarum species contributing the highest percentage to this group. These airborne spores are more common during the summer and fall seasons; in the summer there can be as many as 15,000 spores per m^{3} air of C. herbarum. Cladosporium herbarum is also found all over the world on dead organic material, in the soil, and sometimes appears as a plant parasite. It is also a common fungus found in indoor environments.

== Growth ==
In young cultures, newly-formed spores show growth by budding into a large, multi-branched mycelium. It has an optimal growth temperature between 18 °C (64 °F) and 28 °C (82 °F), with a maximum growth temperature between 28 °C (82 °F) and 32 °C (90 °F). It has been shown to grow at temperatures as low as −6 °C (21 °F), and −10 °C (14 °F); allowing it to grow actively (albeit slowly) on frozen materials. Cladosporium herbarum can also grow in dry environments (xerophile). C. herbarum grows optimally at pH 6 but tolerates environments with a pH as low as 4.4. Conidium production is higher in wet than dry conditions. The production of spores is inhibited by rubratoxin B and aflatoxin. Its growth is inhibited in atmospheres of reduced oxygen and increased carbon dioxide. Mycosphaerella tassiana is the sexual reproductive stage (teleomorph) of C. herbarum.

== Morphology ==
Spores produced by C. herbarum can be lemon-shaped or cone-shaped, often composed of 2-4 cells (3-23 mm). One-celled conidia (5.5-13 x 3.8-6 μm) also exist. In culture, newly-formed spores appear mostly 1-celled, later forming tree-like colonies with multiple branches. The stalks which produce C. herbarum spores are 250 μm long and 3-6 μm wide. They appear swollen at the tip and in between cells, and have irregularly bent branches. Under microscopy, these stalks appear pale or dark brown in color and have smooth or rough walls. When submerged in fluid, they become brittle and break up completely into spores and rod-like fragments. Colonies grown on Czapek yeast extract agar (CYA) and malt extract agar (MEA) appear velvety or fluffy, with smooth or slightly wrinkled walls, and are green or brown in color. The reverse side of the colony appears a darker green or grey/black. Colonies can appear both sparse or densely grown. At 5 °C (41 °F), colonies are 1-2 mm in diameter.

== Habitat and ecology ==
This species is distributed worldwide, inhabiting polar, temperate, mediterranean, subtropical, tropical, forest, grassland, and arable soil regions. It is found frequently in wood exposed to soil, deep soil depths, and the highly nutritious soil directly surrounding the roots of plants (rhizosphere). It is one of the early colonizers on dying and dead plants (saprobe), especially the leaves and stems of both aquatic and desert plant species (for example ferns and mosses). It is the most common fungal species found on living leaves (given suitable conditions) and dead plant material in very moist environments. It also has an adaptation to high salt concentrations (has been found in high salinity sediments) and extremely dry areas (xerophilic).

Cladosporium herbarum causes spoilage of fresh fruits and vegetables including yams, peaches, nectarines, apricots, plums, cherries, tomatoes, and melons. Its common occurrence on fresh apples can lead to contamination of apple juice and fruit based products. It has also been found in eggs, hazelnuts, cereals, chickpeas, soybeans, and frozen fruit pastries. Cladosporium herbarum can also spoil cheese and pasteurized soft cheese, causing problems during its manufacturing. Being able to survive at temperatures below freezing, C. herbarum can cause "black spot" spoilage of meat in cold storage (between −6 °C (21 °F) and 0 °C (32 °F)). It has been isolated from fresh, frozen, and processed meats.

Cladosporium herbarum has been isolated from caterpillars, nests, feathers, pellets of free-living birds, nests of gerbils, bee honeycombs, internal organs of frogs, and earthworms. It has also been found indoors on walls, wallpaper, textiles, rubber strips of window-frames, and bathrooms. Increased release of C. herbarum spores is correlated with increasing temperatures, daylight, and declining humidity. This species appears more frequently during the summer than the winter with peak concentrations of airborne spores found during the afternoon of a 24 hour cycle. The spores are easily carried through the air and can be transported long distances including over oceans.

== Pathogenicity ==
This fungus is non-pathogenic, but its ability to freely produce spores that are easily dispersed in air currents adds to its effect as a fungal airway allergen; it is one of the main fungal causes of asthma and hay fever in the Western Hemisphere. More than 60 antigens derived from C. herbarum have been detected, and 36 of these have immunoglobulin E (IgE) binding properties. Most of these antigens are proteins found inside cells, and eight of these antigens are members of the World Health Organization's official allergen list. There is variation in allergen content between different strains of C. herbarum .

Toxic effects of C. herbarum on warm-blood animals have been reported when they were fed with heavily infected wheat. It can produce a toxin causing mucosal damage in horses, and mycelium extracts are shown to have low-level toxicity in chicken embryos.

C. herbarum is also fungal plant pathogen. Its hosts include Bryum, Buxbaumia, Gyroweissia, Tortula, and Dicranella. It can cause Cladosporium ear rot on corn.

== Molecular genetics ==
Most often, C. herbarum conidia have 1 nucleus, but some can have 2 nuclei. During mitosis, 5 to 8 dot-like chromosomes have been observed. Based on DNA analysis, they have a guanine-cytosine content (GC-content) of 55%. Using molecular diagnostics, C. herbarum internal transcribed spacer (ITS) sequences have been found to be identical to those of Cyphellophora laciniata.
