= Cladosporium dominicanum =

Scientific classification
- Kingdom: Fungi
- Division: Ascomycota
- Class: Dothideomycetes
- Order: Cladosporiales
- Family: Cladosporiaceae
- Genus: Cladosporium
- Species: C. dominicanum

Binomial name
- Cladosporium dominicanum Zalar, de Hoog, Schroers, Crous, Groenewald & Gunde-Cimerman (2007)

Species of fungus

Cladosporium dominicanum is a fungus found in hypersaline environments. It has globoid conidia. It has also been found in plant material.
