= Chaetoplea =

Scientific classification
- Kingdom: Fungi
- Division: Ascomycota
- Class: Dothideomycetes
- Order: Pleosporales
- Family: Leptosphaeriaceae
- Genus: Chaetoplea (Sacc.) Clem.

Genus of fungi

Chaetoplea is a genus of fungi in the Leptosphaeriaceae family. As accepted by Wijayawardene et al. 2020;

It was earlier placed in the family Phaeosphaeriaceae in 2007.

== Species ==
As accepted by Species Fungorum:

- Chaetoplea amygdaloides (Ellis & Everh.) M.E. Barr (1990)
- Chaetoplea apicirubida M.E. Barr (1990)
- Chaetoplea aspera (Ellis & Everh.) M.E. Barr (1990)
- Chaetoplea carpinicola (Ellis & Everh.) M.E. Barr (1990)
- Chaetoplea crossota (Ellis & Everh.) M.E. Barr (1990)
- Chaetoplea dasylirii A.W. Ramaley (1995)
- Chaetoplea ellisii (Sacc. & P. Syd.) M.E. Barr (1990)
- Chaetoplea gregaria Z.Q. Yuan & M.E. Barr (1994)
- Chaetoplea helenae (Ellis & Everh.) M.E. Barr (1990)
- Chaetoplea hyphasmatis (Ellis & Everh.) M.E. Barr (1990)
- Chaetoplea inverecunda (De Not.) Checa (1998)
- Chaetoplea longiasca Z.Q. Yuan & M.E. Barr (1994)
- Chaetoplea longispora (H. Wegelin) M.E. Barr (1990)
- Chaetoplea nubilosa (Ellis & Everh.) M.E. Barr (1990)
- Chaetoplea oblongata (Niessl) M.E. Barr (1990)
- Chaetoplea oblongispora (Ellis & Everh.) M.E. Barr (1987)
- Chaetoplea pusilla (P. Karst. & Malbr.) M.E. Barr (1981)
- Chaetoplea rosipapilla A.W. Ramaley & M.E. Barr (1995)
- Chaetoplea sotolifoliorum A.W. Ramaley (1995)
- Chaetoplea stenocarpa (Ellis & Everh.) M.E. Barr (1990)
- Chaetoplea strigosa M.E. Barr (1990)
- Chaetoplea umbilicata (Ellis) M.E. Barr (1990)
- Chaetoplea variabilis (Ellis & Everh.) M.E. Barr (1990)

Former species; Chaetoplea calvescens (Fr. ex Desm.) Clem. (1931) = Neocamarosporium calvescens, Neocamarosporiaceae
