= Entodesmium =

Scientific classification
- Kingdom: Fungi
- Division: Ascomycota
- Class: Dothideomycetes
- Order: Pleosporales
- Family: Lophiostomataceae
- Genus: Entodesmium; Riess

Type species
- Entodesmium rude Riess

Genus of fungi

Entodesmium is a genus of fungi in the family Lophiostomataceae.
