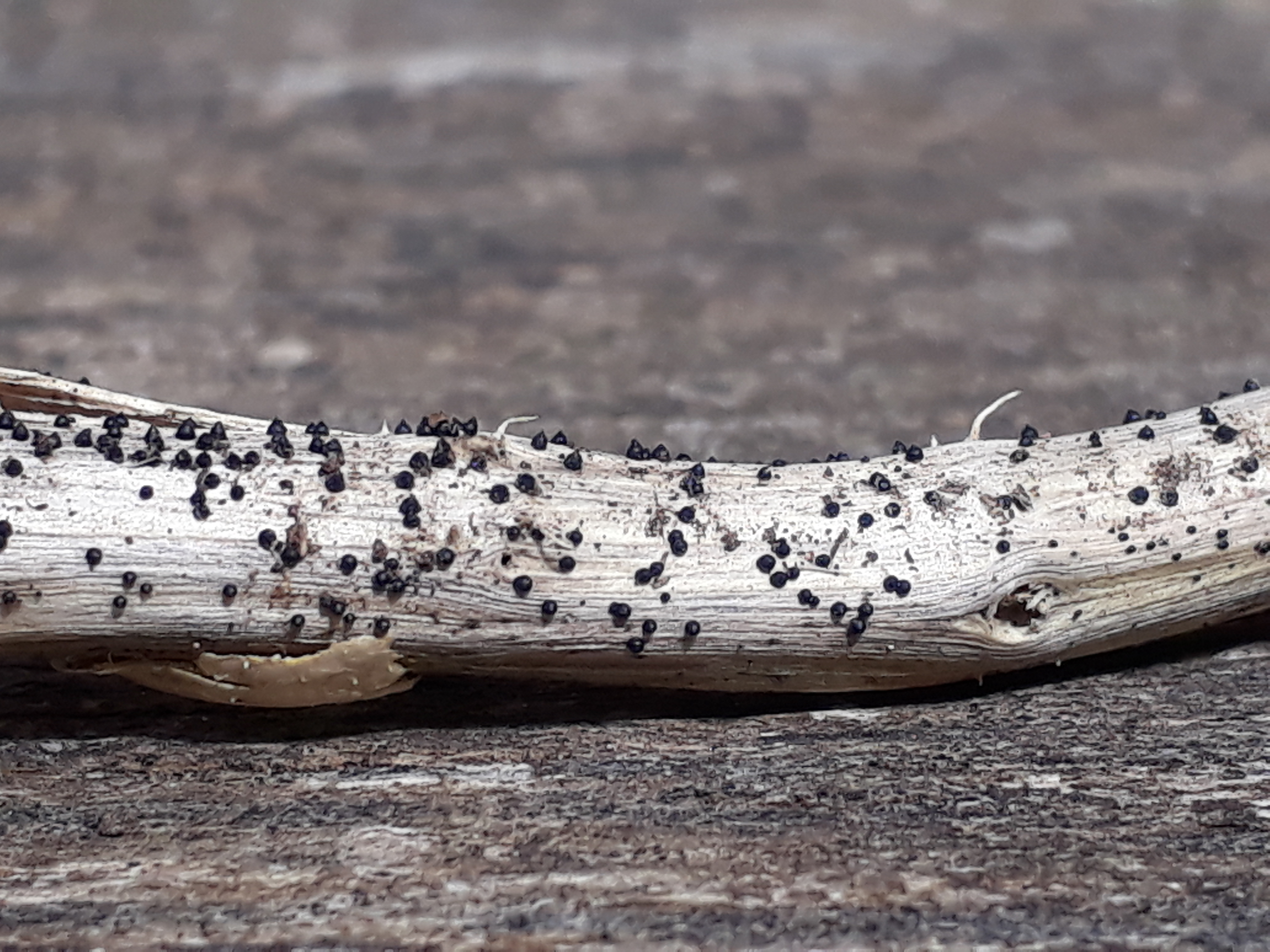
- Leptosphaeria acuta on an old stem of common nettle

Scientific classification
- Domain: Eukaryota
- Kingdom: Fungi
- Division: Ascomycota
- Class: Dothideomycetes
- Order: Pleosporales
- Family: Leptosphaeriaceae
- Genus: Leptosphaeria
- Species: L. acuta

Binomial name
- Leptosphaeria acuta (Moug. & Nestl.) P. Karst., (1873)

Synonyms
- List: Heptameria acuta (Moug. & Nestl.) Cooke Leptophoma urticae (Schulzer & Sacc.) Höhn. Phoma urticae Schulzer & Sacc., (1869) Sphaeria acuta Moug. Sphaeria coniformis Fr., (1818)

= Leptosphaeria acuta =

Species of fungus

Leptosphaeria acuta (also known as nettle rash) is a plant pathogen found on the dead stems of common nettle (Urtica dioica).
