= Schiffnerula cannabis =

Scientific classification
- Kingdom: Fungi
- Division: Ascomycota
- Class: Dothideomycetes
- Family: Englerulaceae
- Genus: Schiffnerula
- Species: S. cannabis

Binomial name
- Schiffnerula cannabis McPartl. & S.Hughes, (1995)

Species of fungus

Schiffnerula cannabis is a plant pathogen infecting hemp. It is one of the many 88 species of fungi which attack Cannabis and with time. The black mildew of Cannabis, compared to gray mold caused by Botrytis cinerea, and the problems it causes are often not extreme as opposed to the gray mold with the potential to wipe a crop in merely a week.

== Host and symptoms ==
A host species for Schiffnerula cannabis has yet to be named. However, a variety of signs are present with Schiffnerula cannabis. Respectively as black mildew are, flat, gray-black, and film like areas throughout the leaf, colonies of conidia on the surface of leaves, as well as ascomata and ascii are present on hosts as Schiffnerula cannabis runs its course. In addition, black mold colonies can be amphigenous and thin; the hyphae with a brown hue and flexuous like the pathogen Schiffnerula azadirachtae.

== Disease cycle ==
Infection typically takes place at leaves, soft stems, and petioles via airborne inoculum from conidia. Closely related to sooty moulds, black mildews produce hyphopodia which function similarly to haustoria. There are two types of hyphopodia which are capitate and mucronate; capitate hyphopodia are lobed appressoria where haustoria are formed, while mucronate hyphopodia are single celled structures that direct away from the leaf. These do not form haustoria nor are their function known yet. Black mildews and sooty moulds also develop on insect secretions or glands of plants which produce nectar. Over time, colonies develop ascomata as its sexual form of reproduction and conidiophores as its asexual form of reproduction. Within the ascii are eight ascospores, and the ascomata are circular and contain 1 to 3 ascii. Dispersal can also take place through water-transported ascospores.

== Environment ==
Schiffnerula cannabis is found in Nepal, though other Schiffnerula are abundant in tropical and subtropical environments. These environments help facilitate fungal growth. With plenty of free water present, in addition to a food source and oxygen, the black fungus can easily thrive in the aforementioned environment. Moisture aside, the temperature of these environments also contribute to the ease of fungal growth. Evidently, the higher temperatures provided in a tropical setting clearly favor Schiffnerula’s development as its place of origin resides within Nepal. Through thorough examination of colonies in the field, there is an abundance of ant, thrips, and small insect activity. Thus, insects are likely a vector of the black mildew.
