= Stemphylium cannabinum =

Scientific classification
- Kingdom: Fungi
- Division: Ascomycota
- Class: Dothideomycetes
- Order: Pleosporales
- Family: Pleosporaceae
- Genus: Stemphylium
- Species: S. cannabinum

Binomial name
- Stemphylium cannabinum (Bakhtin & Gutner) Dobrozr. 1956

Synonyms
- Macrosporium cannabinum Bakhtin & Gutner 1933

Species of fungus

Stemphylium cannabinum is a plant pathogen that infects hemp.

== See also ==
- Dobrozrakova, Taisiia Leonidovna; Letova, M.F.; Stepanov, K.M.; Khokhryakov, M.K. 1956. Opredelitel' Bolezni Rastenii [A manual on the determination of plant diseases]. :1-661
