= Ophiobolus cannabinus =

Scientific classification
- Domain: Eukaryota
- Kingdom: Fungi
- Division: Ascomycota
- Class: Dothideomycetes
- Order: Pleosporales
- Family: Phaeosphaeriaceae
- Genus: Ophiobolus
- Species: O. cannabinus

Binomial name
- Ophiobolus cannabinus Pass. 1888

Species of fungus

Ophiobolus cannabinus is a plant pathogen that causes stem canker on hemp.
