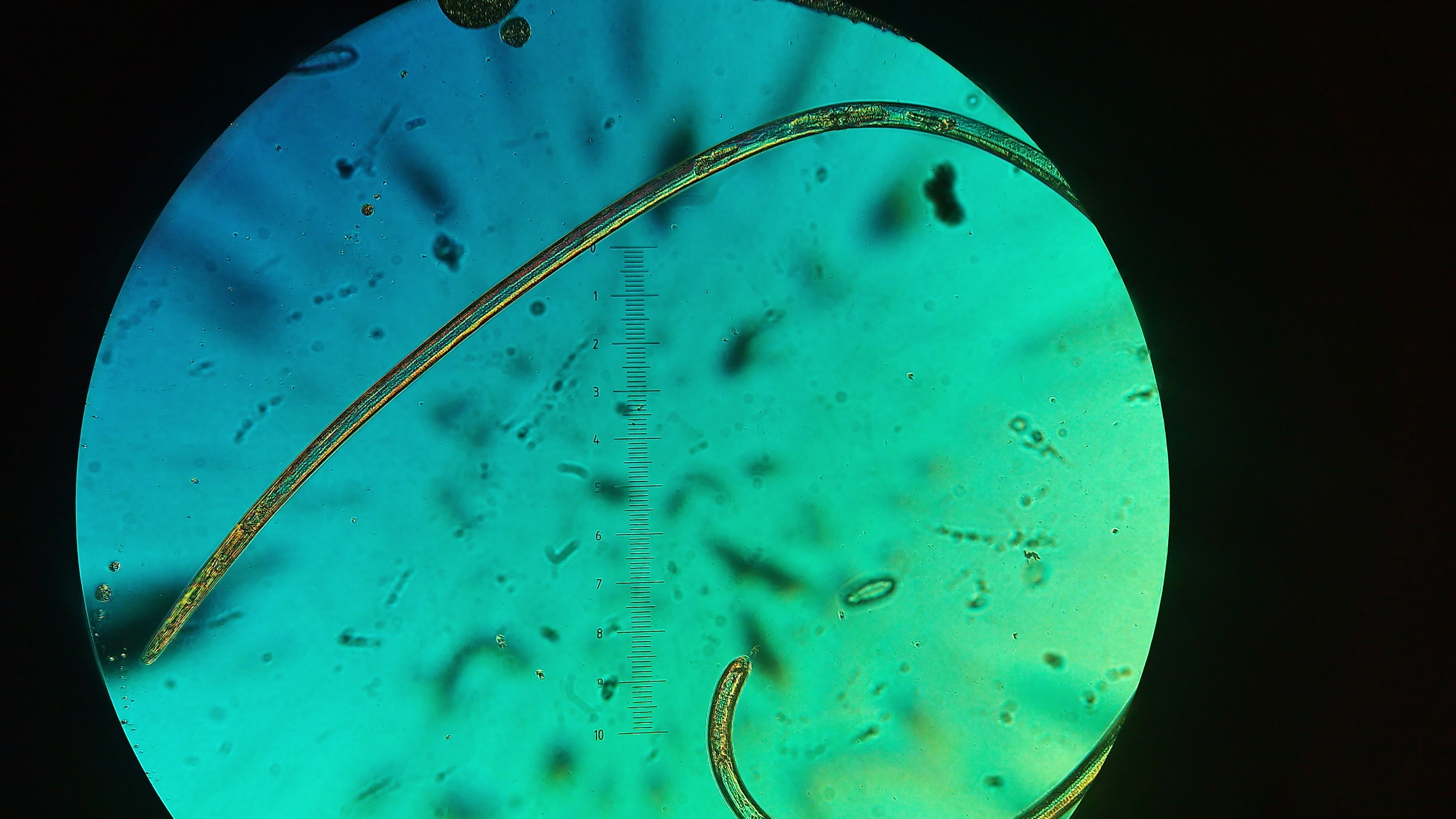
- A microscopic picture of a Paralongidorus maximus

Scientific classification
- Kingdom: Animalia
- Phylum: Nematoda
- Class: Enoplea
- Order: Dorylaimida
- Family: Longidoridae
- Genus: Paralongidorus
- Species: P. maximus

Binomial name
- Paralongidorus maximus (Butschli, 1874)

Synonyms
- Longidorus maximus

= Paralongidorus maximus =

Species of roundworm

Paralongidorus maximus is a plant pathogenic nematode infecting hemp.

== See also ==
- List of hemp diseases
