= Cylindrosporium cannabinum =

Scientific classification
- Kingdom: Fungi
- Division: Ascomycota
- Class: Leotiomycetes
- Order: Helotiales
- Family: Ploettnerulaceae
- Genus: Cylindrosporium
- Species: C. cannabinum

Binomial name
- Cylindrosporium cannabinum Ibrah., (1955)

Species of fungus

Cylindrosporium cannabinum is a species of Ascomycota and a plant pathogen.
