= Dendrophoma marconii =

Scientific classification
- Kingdom: Fungi
- Division: Ascomycota
- Class: Sordariomycetes
- Order: Chaetosphaeriales
- Family: Chaetosphaeriaceae
- Genus: Dendrophoma
- Species: D. marconii

Binomial name
- Dendrophoma marconii Cavara (1888)

Species of fungus

Dendrophoma marconii is an ascomycete fungus that is a plant pathogen.
