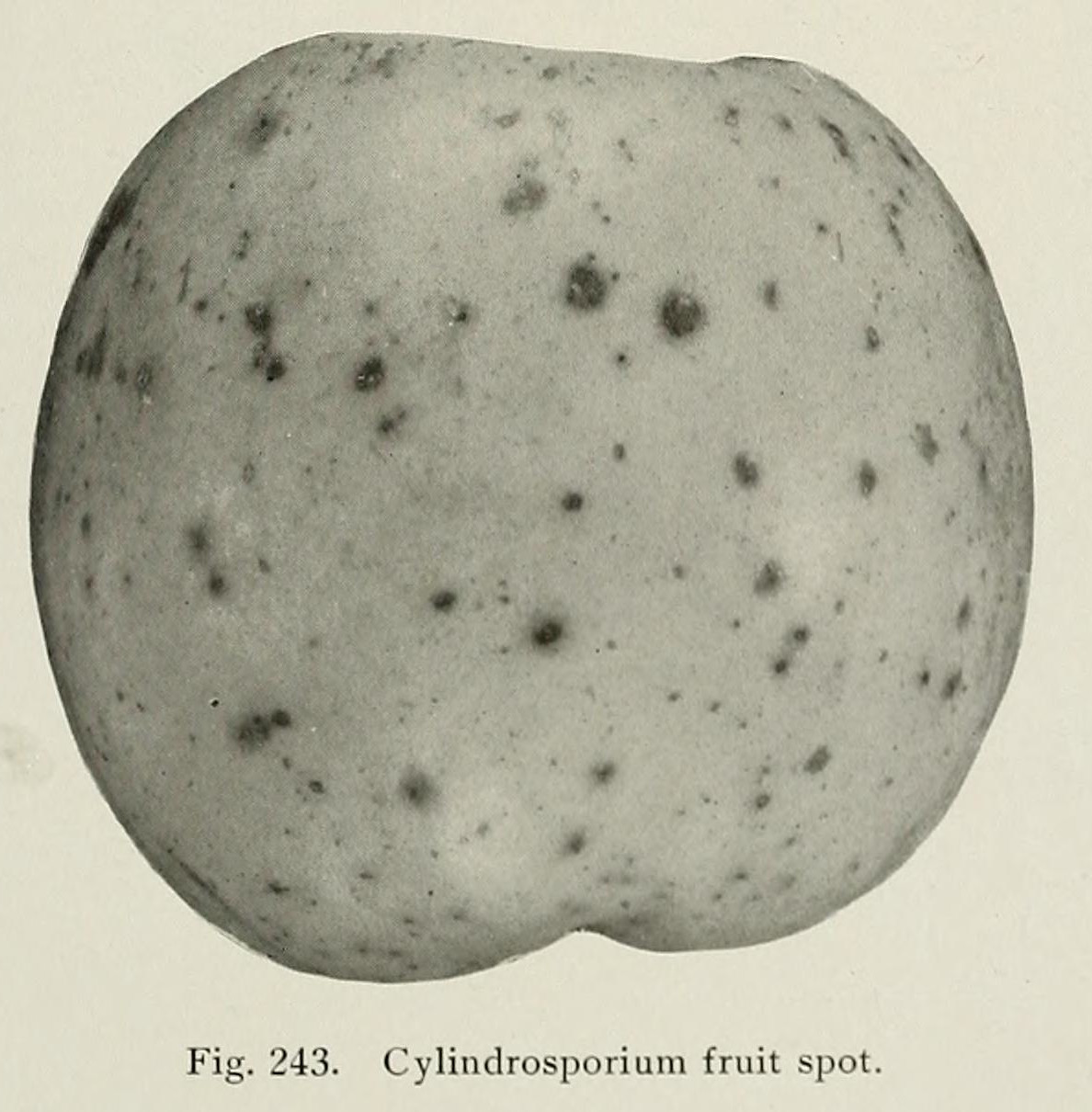
- Cylindrosporium fruit spot

Scientific classification
- Kingdom: Fungi
- Division: Ascomycota
- Class: Leotiomycetes
- Order: Helotiales
- Family: Ploettnerulaceae
- Genus: Cylindrosporium; Grev., 1822

Species
- 167 Species; See text

= Cylindrosporium =

Genus of fungi

Cylindrosporium is a genus of parasitic fungi. The genus includes several plant pathogens that cause leaf spot.

== Species ==
As of 2023, there are 167 species of Cylindrosporium described

- Cylindrosporium acaciae Anahosur (1969)
- Cylindrosporium aceris Kuhnh.-Lord. & J.P. Barry (1949)
- Cylindrosporium aceris-obtusati Bubák (1915)
- Cylindrosporium albanicum (Petr.) Vassiljevsky (1950)
- Cylindrosporium allii Annal. (1972)
- Cylindrosporium amaranthi H.Y. Wang, Z.Y. Zhang & Ying Y. Wang (2014)
- Cylindrosporium andropogonis R. Sprague & Rogerson (1956)
- Cylindrosporium aquilinum (Pass.) J.C. Gilman & W.A. Archer (1929)
- Cylindrosporium arbuti Vienn.-Bourg. (1947)
- Cylindrosporium aroniae Sacc. (1920)
- Cylindrosporium artemisiae Dearn. & Barthol. (1917)
- Cylindrosporium arundinaceum Moesz & Smarods (1941)
- Cylindrosporium asphodeli Kuhnh.-Lord. & J.P. Barry (1949)
- Cylindrosporium associata Bubák (1904)
- Cylindrosporium astrantiae Ibrah. (1955)
- Cylindrosporium atragenes Bres. (1926)
- Cylindrosporium balsamorrhizae Solheim (1970)
- Cylindrosporium bambusae I. Miyake & Hara (1910)
- Cylindrosporium basiplanum Vassiljevsky (1950)
- Cylindrosporium baudysianum Sacc. (1914)
- Cylindrosporium berberidis M.T. Lucas & Sousa da Câmara (1955)
- Cylindrosporium betulae Davis (1909)
- Cylindrosporium bombycinum Kalani (1963)
- Cylindrosporium brevispinum Dearn. (1924)
- Cylindrosporium burkei W.B. Cooke & C.G. Shaw (1952)
- Cylindrosporium californicum Earle (1905)
- Cylindrosporium camelliae Gonz. Frag. (1924)
- Cylindrosporium canadense Vassiljevsky (1950)
- Cylindrosporium cannabinum Ibrah. (1955)
- Cylindrosporium carpogenum Vassiljevsky (1950)
- Cylindrosporium casaresii Gonz. Frag. (1918)
- Cylindrosporium cassiae Chipl. (1970)
- Cylindrosporium castaneae (Lév.) Krenner (1944)
- Cylindrosporium cerris (Kabát & Bubák) Bubák (1915)
- Cylindrosporium chaerophylli Bres. (1926)
- Cylindrosporium changbai-pini G.Z. Wang (1983)
- Cylindrosporium cisti Gonz. Frag. (1921)
- Cylindrosporium consociatum Dearn. (1924)
- Cylindrosporium convolvuli Miura (1928)
- Cylindrosporium convolvulicola Vassiljevsky (1950)
- Cylindrosporium corni Solheim (1950)
- Cylindrosporium coryli Ibrah. & T.M. Achundov (1955)
- Cylindrosporium crataeginum Erdoğdu & Hüseyın (2007)
- Cylindrosporium cuscutae Rudakov (1963)
- Cylindrosporium cynanchi Ibrah. & T.M. Achundov (1955)
- Cylindrosporium defolians (Harkn.) Vassiljevsky (1950)
- Cylindrosporium defoliatum Heald & F.A. Wolf (1911)
- Cylindrosporium dichanthii T.S. Ramakr. & K. Ramakr. (1950)
- Cylindrosporium dictamni (Fuckel) Lebedeva (1926)
- Cylindrosporium eleocharidis Lentz (1962)
- Cylindrosporium eminens Davis (1919)
- Cylindrosporium ephedrae Golovin (1950)
- Cylindrosporium epilobianum Sacc. & Fautrey (1900)
- Cylindrosporium eremodauci Annal. (1972)
- Cylindrosporium eryngii Ellis & Kellerm. (1887)
- Cylindrosporium eryngiicola Vassiljevsky (1950)
- Cylindrosporium eugeniicola Bat. & Peres (1964)
- Cylindrosporium excipuliforme Vassiljevsky (1950)
- Cylindrosporium exiguum Syd. & P. Syd. (1913)
- Cylindrosporium fairmanianum Sacc. (1908)
- Cylindrosporium falcariae Lobik (1928)
- Cylindrosporium ferulinum Tartenova (1971)
- Cylindrosporium fraserae Wehm. (1946)
- Cylindrosporium fraxinicola Dearn. & House (1925)
- Cylindrosporium fusarioides (Sacc.) Vassiljevsky (1950)
- Cylindrosporium garbowskii Vassiljevsky (1950)
- Cylindrosporium golenkinianthes Annal. (1974)
- Cylindrosporium gorlenkovii Annal. (1972)
- Cylindrosporium griseum Heald & F.A. Wolf (1911)
- Cylindrosporium gypsophilae Annal. (1977)
- Cylindrosporium gyrocarpi Syd. & P. Syd. (1913)
- Cylindrosporium hansenii Bubák (1915)
- Cylindrosporium infuscans Ellis & Everh. (1902)
- Cylindrosporium insularum Roldan (1938)
- Cylindrosporium interstitiale H.C. Greene (1953)
- Cylindrosporium irregulare (Peck) Dearn. (1923)
- Cylindrosporium jacaratia Viégas (1946)
- Cylindrosporium juglandis F.A. Wolf (1914)
- Cylindrosporium komarowii Jacz. (1900)
- Cylindrosporium kuznetzovianum Pisareva (1971)
- Cylindrosporium lathyri Bubák & Kabát (1907)
- Cylindrosporium latifolium Magnus (1900)
- Cylindrosporium libanotidis Schwarzman & Vasyag. (1971)
- Cylindrosporium lippiae Heald & F.A. Wolf (1911)
- Cylindrosporium malisoricum Bubák (1906)
- Cylindrosporium mappiae Thirum. & Naras. (1950)
- Cylindrosporium matricariae Died. (1914)
- Cylindrosporium melitense Sacc. (1914)
- Cylindrosporium mespili Woron. (1927)
- Cylindrosporium montenegrinum Bubák (1915)
- Cylindrosporium muscaris Annal. (1981)
- Cylindrosporium nanum Cooke (1886)
- Cylindrosporium negundinis Ellis & Everh. (1894)
- Cylindrosporium nepetae Annal. (1972)
- Cylindrosporium nevodovskii Vasyag. (1971)
- Cylindrosporium nuttalliae (Harkn.) Dearn. (1924)
- Cylindrosporium onobrychidis (P. Syd.) Died. (1912)
- Cylindrosporium orchis Annal. (1975)
- Cylindrosporium oreoweisiae Gonz. Frag. (1922)
- Cylindrosporium orobicola (Sacc.) Bubák (1907)
- Cylindrosporium ostryae Woron. (1927)
- Cylindrosporium oxyriae Vasyag. (1971)
- Cylindrosporium parvum P.J. Anderson (1918)
- Cylindrosporium pentagynae Ibrah. (1955)
- Cylindrosporium petastomum Viégas (1946)
- Cylindrosporium phalaenopsidis Sawada (1931)
- Cylindrosporium phalaridis Sacc. & Dearn. (1915)
- Cylindrosporium phillyreae Bernaux (1965)
- Cylindrosporium pisi G. Berger (1938)
- Cylindrosporium platanoidis (Allesch.) Died. (1912)
- Cylindrosporium pollaccii Turconi (1911)
- Cylindrosporium pomicola Vassiljevsky (1950)
- Cylindrosporium populinum (Peck) Vassiljevsky (1950)
- Cylindrosporium potebniae Vassiljevsky (1950)
- Cylindrosporium potentillae Ibrah. (1955)
- Cylindrosporium pruinosum (Zaprom.) Vassiljevsky (1950)
- Cylindrosporium pruni-tomentosae Miura (1928)
- Cylindrosporium pseudoplatani (Roberge ex Desm.) Died. (1912)
- Cylindrosporium quercinum J.C. Carter (1941)
- Cylindrosporium ramicola Laubert (1928)
- Cylindrosporium rosae Vasyag. (1971)
- Cylindrosporium rubianum Ibrah. & T.M. Achundov (1955)
- Cylindrosporium salicifoliae (Trel.) Davis (1919)
- Cylindrosporium salicinum (Peck) Dearn. (1917)
- Cylindrosporium salviifolii Bernaux (1949)
- Cylindrosporium saximontanense Solheim (1950)
- Cylindrosporium scirpi Pavgi & L. Singh (1977)
- Cylindrosporium scirpivorum R. Sprague (1958)
- Cylindrosporium securidacae Chardón (1946)
- Cylindrosporium septatum Romell (1892)
- Cylindrosporium serebrianikowii (Bubák) Bubák (1915)
- Cylindrosporium shepherdiae Sacc. (1913)
- Cylindrosporium sibiricum Dearn. & Bisby (1928)
- Cylindrosporium siculum Briosi & Cavara (1904)
- Cylindrosporium silenes Unamuno (1942)
- Cylindrosporium silenicola Woron. (1927)
- Cylindrosporium smilacinae Ellis & Everh. (1900)
- Cylindrosporium smilacis Ellis & Everh. (1900)
- Cylindrosporium solitarium Heald & F.A. Wolf (1911)
- Cylindrosporium spigeliae Dearn. & House (1915)
- Cylindrosporium spiraeae-thunbergii Miura ex Tak. Kobay. (1979)
- Cylindrosporium spiraeicola Ellis & Everh. (1900)
- Cylindrosporium subcuticulare Vassiljevsky (1950)
- Cylindrosporium swidae Ibrah. & T.M. Achundov (1955)
- Cylindrosporium tenuisporum Heald & F.A. Wolf (1911)
- Cylindrosporium thalictrinum Woron. (1927)
- Cylindrosporium torquens Sacc. (1915)
- Cylindrosporium transcaucasicum Ibrah. & T.M. Achundov (1955)
- Cylindrosporium tremulae (Höhn.) Vassiljevsky (1950)
- Cylindrosporium triflori H.C. Greene (1944)
- Cylindrosporium tristaniae (Henn.) Died. (1915)
- Cylindrosporium tulipae Annal. (1977)
- Cylindrosporium typhae Sacc. (1915)
- Cylindrosporium uljanishchevii Ibrah. & T.M. Achundov (1955)
- Cylindrosporium umbelliferarum Wehm. (1947)
- Cylindrosporium utahense Solheim (1970)
- Cylindrosporium vaccariae Annal. (1975)
- Cylindrosporium vaccarianum Sacc. (1917)
- Cylindrosporium vaccinii H.C. Greene (1958)
- Cylindrosporium vagnerae (Petr.) Vassiljevsky (1950)
- Cylindrosporium veratrinum Sacc. & G. Winter (1882)
- Cylindrosporium verbenae T.M. Achundov (1955)
- Cylindrosporium vermiiforme Davis (1915)
- Cylindrosporium viciae Miura (1928)
- Cylindrosporium viciae-urijugae Sawada (1958)
- Cylindrosporium viticis Woron. (1915)
- Cylindrosporium yuccae Montemart. (1915)

== Gallery ==
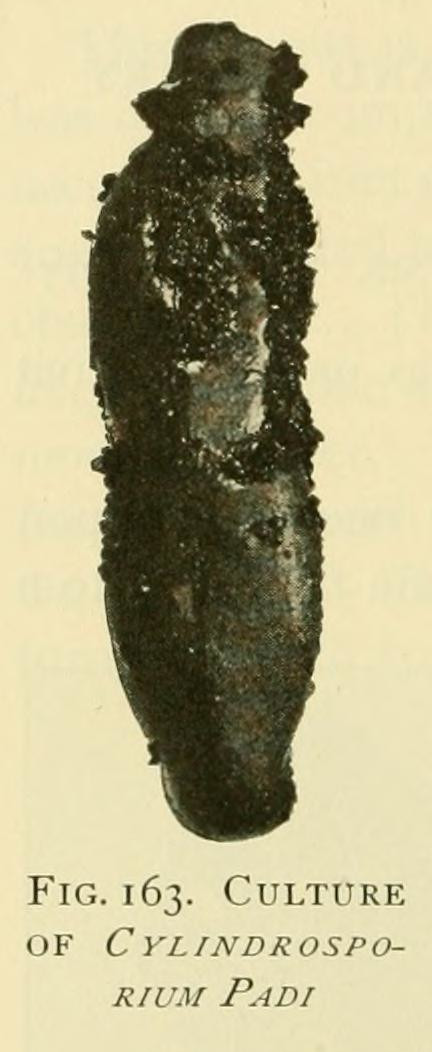
Culture of Cylindrosporium padi

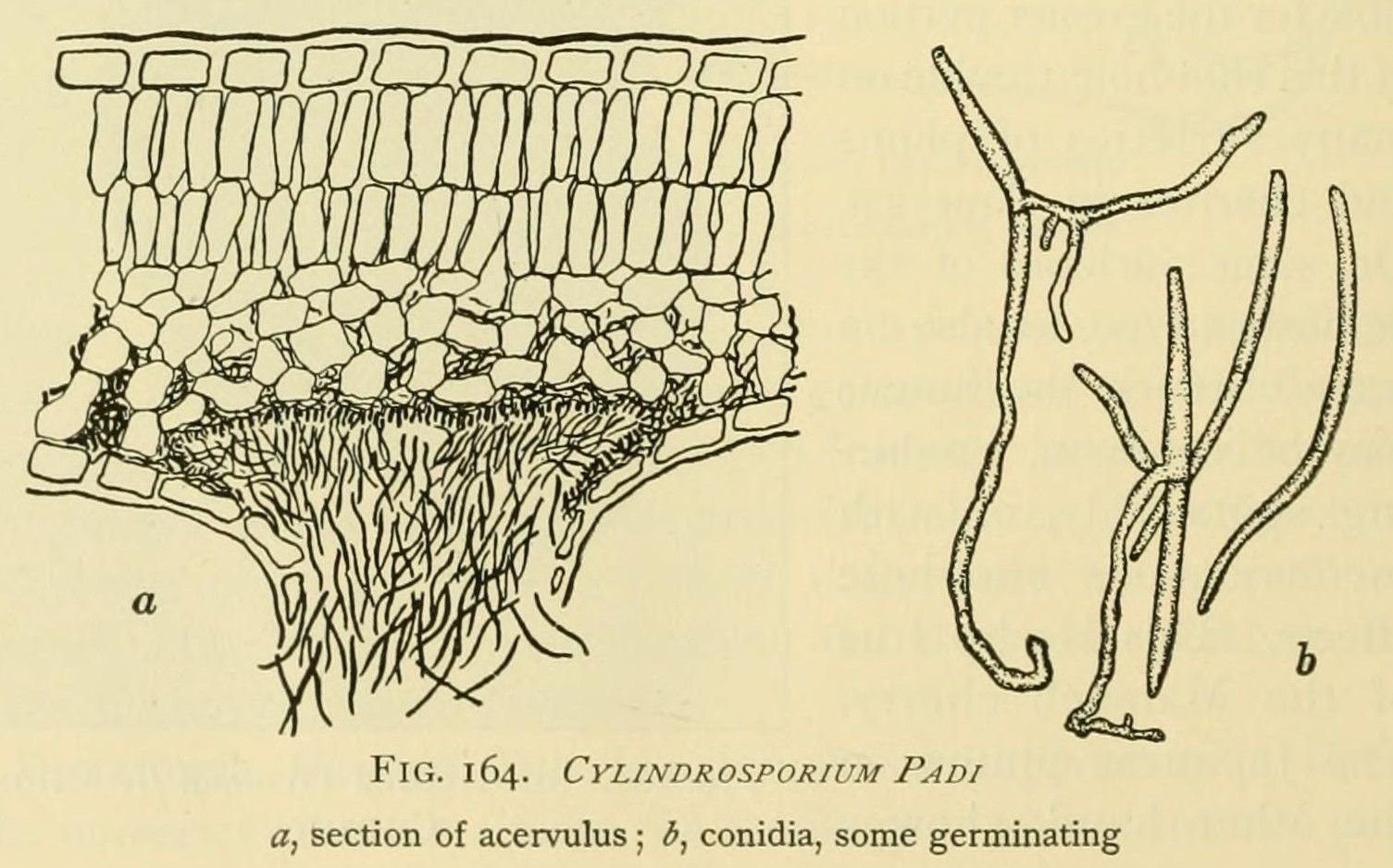
Cylindrosporium padi a) section of acervulus, b) conidia, some germinating
