= Ophiobolus anguillides =

Scientific classification
- Kingdom: Fungi
- Division: Ascomycota
- Class: Dothideomycetes
- Order: Pleosporales
- Family: Phaeosphaeriaceae
- Genus: Ophiobolus
- Species: O. anguillides

Binomial name
- Ophiobolus anguillides (Cooke) Sacc., (1883)

Synonyms
- Sphaeria anguillida Cooke 1877

Species of fungus

Ophiobolus anguillides is a plant pathogen that causes stem canker on hemp.
