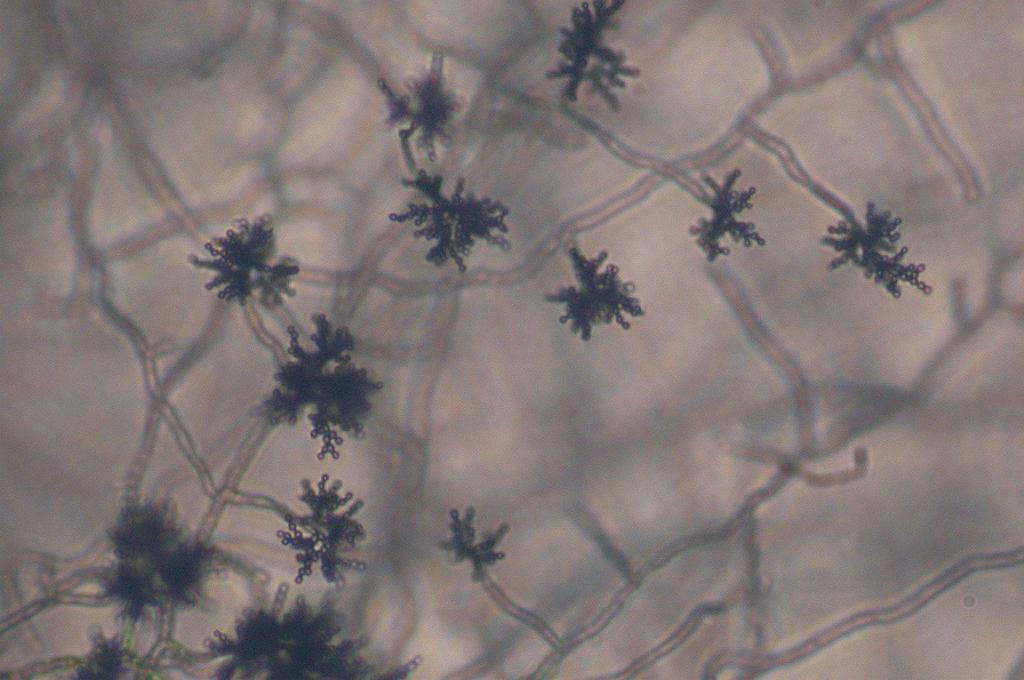

Scientific classification
- Kingdom: Fungi
- Division: Ascomycota
- Class: Dothideomycetes
- Order: Cladosporiales
- Family: Cladosporiaceae
- Genus: Cladosporium; Link (1816)

Type species
- Cladosporium herbarum (Pers.) Link (1816)

Synonyms
- Acrosporella Riedl & Ershad (1977); Azosma Corda (1831); Didymotrichum Bonord. (1851); Heterosporium Klotzsch ex Cooke (1877); Hormodendrum Bonord. (1851); Mydonosporium Corda (1833); Myxocladium Corda (1837); Polyrhizium Giard (1889); Spadicesporium V.N.Boriss. & Dvoïnos (1982); Sporocladium Chevall. (1826)

= Cladosporium =

Genus of fungi

Cladosporium is a genus of fungi including some of the most common indoor and outdoor molds. Some species are endophytes or plant pathogens, while others parasitize fungi.

Species produce olive-green to brown or black colonies, and have dark-pigmented conidia that are formed in simple or branching chains. Many species of Cladosporium are commonly found on living and dead plant material, including Sunflowers. The spores are wind-dispersed and they are often extremely abundant in outdoor air. Indoors Cladosporium species may grow on surfaces when moisture is present.

Cladosporium fulvum, cause of tomato leaf mould, has been an important genetic model, in that the genetics of host resistance are understood. In the 1960s, it was estimated that the genus Cladosporium contained around 500 plant-pathogenic and saprotrophic species, but this number has since been increased to over 772 species. The genus is very closely related to black yeasts in the order Dothideales. Cladosporium species are often highly osmotolerant, growing easily on media containing 10% glucose or 12–17% NaCl. They are rarely grown on media containing 24% NaCl or 50% glucose and never isolated from medium with 32% NaCl or greater. Most species have very fragile spore chains, making it extremely difficult to prepare a mount for microscopic observation in which the conidial chains are preserved intact.

== Health effects ==
Cladosporium species are present in the human mycobiome but are rarely pathogenic to humans. They have been reported to cause infections of the skin and toenails as well as sinuses and lungs, with more common symptoms including nasal congestion, sneezing, coughing, and itchy eyes. The airborne spores of Cladosporium species are significant allergens, and in large amounts they can severely affect people with asthma and other respiratory diseases. Cladosporium species produce no major mycotoxins of concern, but do produce malodorous volatile organic compounds. Cladosporium is not associated with anaphylaxis.

== Ecology ==
Usually, Cladosporium infests dead or dying plant tissue, and in turn serves as food for small mycophagous organisms. On old seedpods of Iris hexagona, the pleasing fungus beetle was found eating the hyphae and spores of Cladosporium which grew there; some of the spores passed the beetle's guts and remained viable, and spores were also found on the adult beetles' exoskeleton.

Several Cladosporium species are known to be hyperparasitic to rust fungi.

== Species ==
- C. acaciicola
- C. acalyphae
- C. adianticola
- C. aecidiicola
- C. agoseridis
- C. albiziae
- C. algarum
- C. allicinum
- C. allii
- C. allii-porri
- C. alliicola
- C. alneum
- C. alopecuri
- C. alternicoloratum
- C. angustisporum
- C. antarcticum
- C. antillanum
- C. aphidis
- C. apicale
- C. aristolochiae
- C. aromaticum
- C. arthoniae
- C. arthrinioides
- C. arthropodii
- C. asperistipitatum
- C. asperulatum
- C. atriellum
- C. atroseptum
- C. auriculae
- C. australiense
- C. baccae
- C. balladynae
- C. banaticum
- C. basi-inflatum
- C. bauhiniana
- C. boenninghauseniae
- C. borassi
- C. bosciae
- C. brachormium
- C. brachyelytri
- C. brassicae
- C. brassicicola
- C. brevicatenulatum
- C. brevipes
- C. breviramosum
- C. brunneoatrum
- C. brunneolum
- C. brunneum
- C. buchananiae
- C. buteicola
- C. butyri
- C. caraganae
- C. carpesii
- C. caryigenum
- C. cassiae-surathensis
- C. castellanii
- C. chalastosporoides
- C. chamaeropis
- C. cheonis
- C. chlamydeum
- C. chrysanthemi
- C. chrysophylli
- C. chubutense
- C. circaea
- C. citri
- C. cladosporioides
- C. colocasiae
- C. colocasiicola
- C. colombiae
- C. confusum
- C. coralloides
- C. coryphae
- C. cucumerinum
- C. cycadacearum
- C. cyrtomii
- C. desmodicola
- C. dianellicola
- C. diaphanum
- C. digitalicola
- C. dominicanum
- C. dracaenatum
- C. edgeworthiae
- C. elegans
- C. elsinoes
- C. epimyces
- C. epiphyllum
- C. erianthi
- C. eriolobi
- C. exasperatum
- C. exile
- C. exobasidii
- C. extorre
- C. ferox
- C. festucae
- C. flabelliforme
- C. foliorum
- C. forsythiae
- C. fraxinicola
- C. fuligineum
- C. fumagineum
- C. funiculosum
- C. fusiforme
- C. galii
- C. gallicola
- C. gamsianum
- C. geniculatum
- C. gerwasiae
- C. globisporum
- C. glochidionis
- C. gloeosporioides
- C. gossypiicola
- C. grevilleae
- C. grumosum
- C. gynoxidicola
- C. halotolerans
- C. haplophylli
- C. harknessii
- C. heleophilum
- C. helicosporum
- C. heliotropii
- C. herbaroides
- C. herbarum
- C. heterophragmatis
- C. heuglinianum
- C. hillianum
- C. hordei
- C. humile
- C. hydrangeae
- C. indicum
- C. indigoferae
- C. inopinum
- C. inversicolor
- C. iranicum
- C. jacarandicola
- C. juglandinum
- C. kapildharens
- C. lacroixii
- C. ladinum
- C. langeronii
- C. laxicapitulatum
- C. leguminicola
- C. leprosum
- C. licheniphilum
- C. linicola
- C. liriodendri
- C. lonicericola
- C. lophodermii
- C. lupiniphilum
- C. machili
- C. macrocarpum
- C. magnusianum
- C. malvacearum
- C. manoutchehrii
- C. melospermae
- C. metaplexis
- C. milii
- C. mimulicola
- C. minourae
- C. molle
- C. murorum
- C. musae
- C. myriosporum
- C. myrtacearum
- C. myrticola
- C. neocheiropteridis
- C. neottopteridis
- C. neriicola
- C. nigrelloides
- C. nigrellum
- C. nitrariae
- C. nodulosum
- C. obtectum
- C. oncobae
- C. orchidearum
- C. orchidiphilum
- C. orchidis
- C. oreodaphnes
- C. ossifragi
- C. ovorum
- C. oxycocci
- C. oxysporum
- C. pallidum
- C. paracladosporioides
- C. perangustum
- C. pericarpium
- C. peruamazonicum
- C. phaenocomae
- C. phlei
- C. phlei-pratensis
- C. phyllachorae
- C. phyllactiniicola
- C. phyllogenum
- C. phyllophilum
- C. pini-ponderosae
- C. pipericola
- C. pisi
- C. platycodonis
- C. polygonati
- C. polymorphosporum
- C. populicola
- C. praecox
- C. psammicola
- C. pseudiridis
- C. pseudocladosporioides
- C. psidiicola
- C. psoraleae
- C. psychrotolerans
- C. punctulatum
- C. ramotenellum
- C. ramulosum
- C. rectangulare
- C. rectoides
- C. rhododendri
- C. robiniae
- C. rutae
- C. salicis-sitchensis
- C. salinae
- C. sarmentorum
- C. scabrellum
- C. silenes
- C. sinuosum
- C. smilacicola
- C. soldanellae
- C. sorghi
- C. sphaeroideum
- C. sphaerospermum
- C. spinaciarum
- C. spinulosum
- C. spongiosum
- C. straminicola
- C. strobilanthis
- C. subinflatum
- C. subnodosum
- C. subobtectum
- C. subsessile
- C. subtilissimum
- C. subuliforme
- C. syringae
- C. syringicola
- C. tectonicola
- C. tenellum
- C. tenuissimum
- C. tetrapanacis
- C. typhae
- C. typharum
- C. uleanum
- C. uniseptosporum
- C. uredinicola
- C. uredinis
- C. varians
- C. velox
- C. velutinum
- C. verrucocladosporioides
- C. victorialis
- C. vignae
- C. vincicola
- C. xylophilum
- C. xyridis
- C. yuccae
- C. zeae
- C. ziziphi
