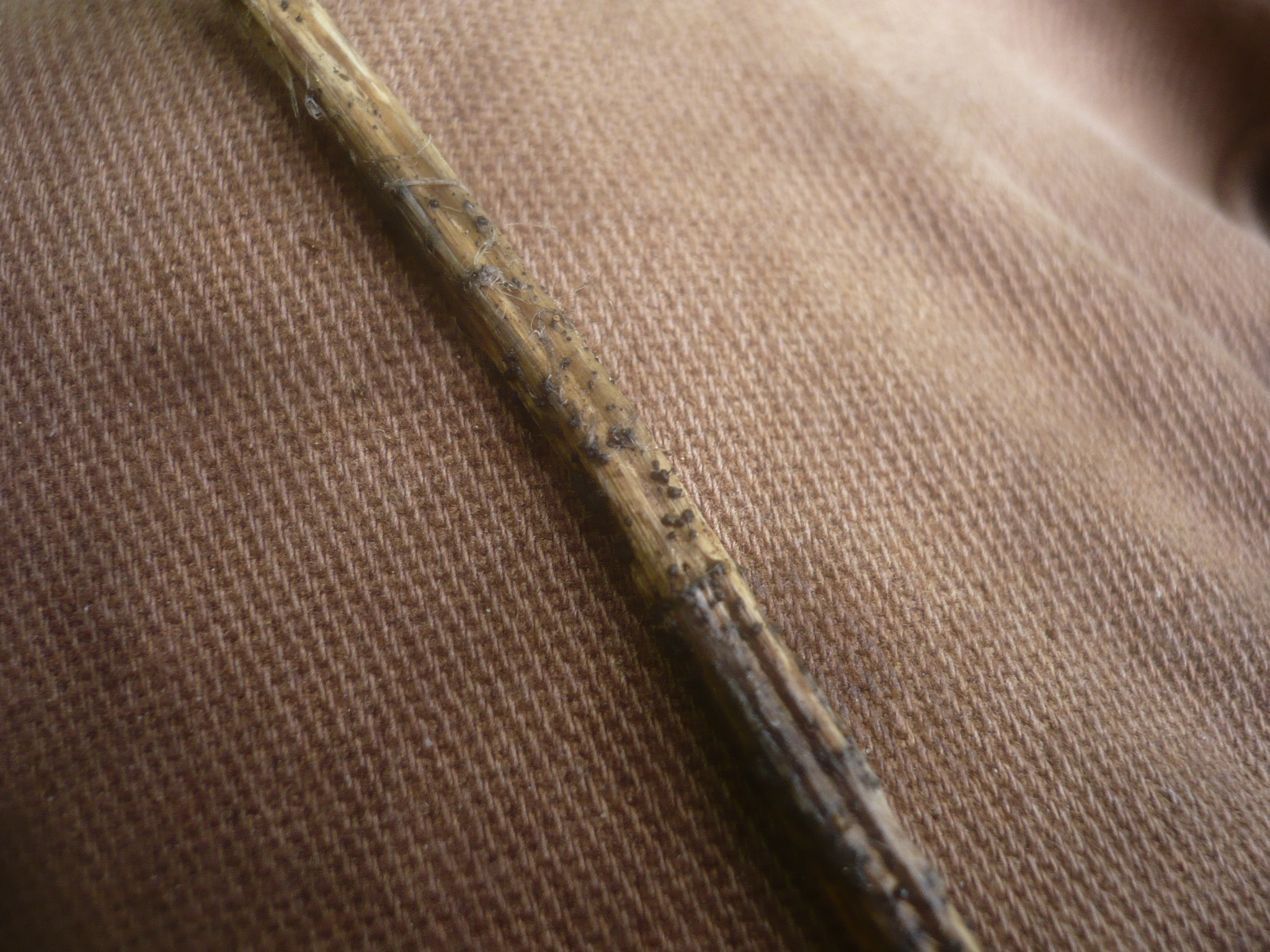
- Leptosphaeria acuta

Scientific classification
- Kingdom: Fungi
- Division: Ascomycota
- Class: Dothideomycetes
- Order: Pleosporales
- Family: Leptosphaeriaceae; M.E.Barr 1987

Type genus
- Leptosphaeria Ces. & De Not. (1863)

= Leptosphaeriaceae =

Family of fungi

The Leptosphaeriaceae are a family of fungi in the order Pleosporales. The family was circumscribed by mycologist Margaret E. Barr in 1987. According to the Dictionary of the Fungi (10th edition, 2008), the family contained 8 genera and 302 species. The family has a widespread distribution, but is especially prevalent in temperate regions. Species are either saprobic or grow as nectrotrophs (organisms that grow and reproduce on dead cells) on the stems or leaves of plants.

== Genera ==
As accepted by Wijayawardene et al. 2020 (with number of species per genus);

- Alloleptosphaeria Ariyaw., Wanas. & K.D. Hyde (1)
- Alternariaster E.G. Simmons (4)
- Chaetoplea (Sacc.) Clem. (ca. 20)
- Heterosporicola Crous (2)
- Leptosphaeria Ces. & De Not. (151)
- Neoleptosphaeria Ariyaw. & K.D. Hyde (2)
- Ochraceocephala Voglmayr & Aiello (1)
- Paraleptosphaeria Gruyter, Aveskamp & Verkley (7)
- Parahendersonia A.W. Ramaley (1995) (2)
- Plenodomus Preuss (18)
- Praeclarispora Doilom, W. Dong, K. D. Hyde & C. F. Liao (1)
- Pseudoleptosphaeria Ariyaw. & K.D. Hyde (1)
- Querciphoma Crous (2)
- Sclerenchymomyces Phukhams. & K.D. Hyde (2)
- Sphaerellopsis Cooke (6)
- Subplenodomus Gruyter, Aveskamp & Verkley (6)
