= Davidiellaceae =

Scientific classification
- Kingdom: Fungi
- Division: Ascomycota
- Class: Dothideomycetes
- Order: Capnodiales
- Family: Davidiellaceae; Schoch, Spatafora, Crous & Shoemaker (2007)

Type genus
- Davidiella Crous & U.Braun (2003)

Family of fungi

The Davidiellaceae are a family of fungi in the Ascomycota, class Dothideomycetes. The family was defined in 2006 based on the results of molecular phylogenetic analysis of various Dothideomycetes species, and contains the genus Davidiella and six other genera.

== Genera ==
- Acroconidiella
- Cladosporium
- Graphiopsis
- Heterosporium
- Hoornsmania
- Hormodendrum
