= List of fungi of South Africa – P =

This is an alphabetical list of the fungal taxa as recorded from South Africa. Currently accepted names have been appended.

== Pa ==
Genus: Pachyphiale

- Pachyphiale cornea (Ach.) Poetsch (1872)accepted as Bacidia cornea (Ach.) A. Massal. (1852)

Genus: Paecilomyces

- Paecilomyces aureo-cinnamomeum Thom.
- Paecilomyces varioti Bain.
- Paecilomyces sp.

Genus: Palawania

- Palawania dovyalidis Nel.
- Palawania eucleae Nel.
- Palawania halleriae Doidge
- Palawania orbiculata Doidge

Genus: Palawaniella

- Palawaniella doryalidis Doidge
- Palawaniella eucleae Doidge
- Palawaniella orbiculata Doidge

Genus: Panaeolus

- Panaeolus caliginosus Gill.
- Panaeolus campanulatus Quel. accepted as Panaeolus papilionaceus (Bull. ex Fries) Quélet
- Panaeolus fimicola Quel.
- Panaeolus papilionaceus (Bull. ex Fries) Quélet
- Panaeolus retirugis Gill. accepted as Panaeolus papilionaceus (Bull. ex Fries) Quélet
- Panaeolus solidipes Peck.

Genus: Pannaria

- Pannaria capensis Steiner.
- Pannaria coenileobadia Massal.
- Pannaria hookeri Nyl. var. leucolepis Th.Fr.
- Pannaria leucolepis Nyl.
- Pannaria leucosticta Tuck. var. isidiopsis Nyl.
- Pannaria lurida Nyl.
- Pannaria phloeodes Stirt.
- Pannaria rubiginosa Del.
- Pannaria rubiginosa var. conoplea Korb.
- Pannaria rubiginosa var. lanuginosa Zahlbr.
- Pannaria rubiginosa var. phloeodes Stizenb.
- Pannaria triptophylla Massal.

Family: Pannariaceae

Genus: Pannularia

- Pannularia leucosticta Stizenb. var. isidiopsis Nyl.

Genus: Panus

- Panus conchatus Fr.
- Panus melanophyllus Fr.
- Panus quaquaversus Berk.
- Panus rudis Fr.
- Panus stipticus Fr.
- Panus stipticus var. farinaceus Rea.
- Panus torulosus Fr.
- Panus wrightii Berk. & Curt.

Genus: Papularia

- Papularia sphaerosperma v. Hohn.

Genus: Paranectria

- Paranectria minuta Hansf.
- Paranectria parasitica Wint.

Genus: Parasterells (sic)

Genus: Parasterina

- Parasterina africana v.d.Byl
- Parasterina brachystoma Theiss.
- Parasterina brachystoma var. laxa Doidge
- Parasterina implicata Doidge
- Parasterina laxa Doidge
- Parasterina reticulata Doidge
- Parasterina rigida Doidge
- Parasterina sp.

Genus: Parastigmatea

- Parastigmatea nervisita Doidge

Genus: Paratheliaceae Paratheliaceae

Genus: Parathelium

- Parathelium trichosporum Stizenb.

Genus: Parendomyces

- Parendomyces zeylanicus Doidge

Genus: Parenglerula

- Parenglerula henningsii Petrak.
- Parenglerula macowaniana v. Hohn.
- Parenglerula macowaniana var. elaeodendri Werd.

Genus: Parmelia (Lichens)

- Parmelia abessinica Nyl. ex Kremp. (1877),accepted as Parmotrema abessinicum (Nyl. ex Kremp.) Hale (1974)
- Parmelia abessinica var. sorediosa Müll.Arg.
- Parmelia abyssinica Nyl.
- Parmelia abyssinica var. sorediosa Müll.Arg.
- Parmelia adhaerens Nyl.
- Parmelia aleuriza Vain.
- Parmelia amphixanthoides Steiner & Zahlbr.
- Parmelia amplexa Stirt.
- Parmelia angolensis Wain.
- Parmelia atrichoides Nyl.
- Parmelia austro-africana Stirt.
- Parmelia austroafricana Zahlbr.
- Parmelia borreri Turn.
- Parmelia borreri var. stictica Duby.
- Parmelia borreri var. ulophvlla Nyl.
- Parmelia brachyphylla Müll.Arg.
- Parmelia brunnthaleri Steiner & Zahlbr.
- Parmelia brunnthaleri f. irregularis Gyeln.
- Parmelia bylii Gyeln.
- Parmelia bylii Vain.
- Parmelia caesia Ach.
- Parmelia caifrorum Zahlbr.
- Parmelia capensis Ach.
- Parmelia capensis Nyl.
- Parmelia caperata (L.) Ach. (1803),accepted as Flavoparmelia caperata (L.) Hale (1986)
- Parmelia centrifuga Ach.
- Parmelia ceresina Vain.
- Parmelia cetrarioides Del.
- Parmelia cetrata Ach.
- Parmelia cetrata f. ciliosa Viaud-Gr. Marais.
- Parmelia cetrata f. sorediifera Wain.
- Parmelia chlorea Stizenb.
- Parmelia citrinireagens Gyeln.
- Parmelia citrinireagens var. angustior Gyeln.
- Parmelia colorata Gyeln.
- Parmelia concolor Spreng.
- Parmelia concolor var. multifida Zahlbr.
- Parmelia concolor var. platyphylla Zahlbr.
- Parmelia concrescens Wain.
- Parmelia conspersa(Ehrh. ex Ach.) Ach. (1803) accepted as Xanthoparmelia conspersa (Ehrh. ex Ach.) Hale (1974)
- Parmelia conspersa f. isidiata Anzi.
- Parmelia conspersa polita, polyphylla Mey.Flotow.
- Parmelia conspersa var. austroafricana Stizenb.
- Parmelia conspersa var. benguellensis Wain.
- Parmelia conspersa var. constrictans Müll.Arg.
- Parmelia conspersa var. endomiltoides Müll.Arg.
- Parmelia conspersa var. eradicata Müll.Arg.
- Parmelia conspersa var. hypoclista Nyl.
- Parmelia conspersa var. hypoclistoides Müll.Arg.
- Parmelia conspersa var. hypomelaena Vain.
- Parmelia conspersa var. incisa Zahlbr.
- Parmelia conspersa var. lacinulata Gyeln.
- Parmelia conspersa var. laxa Müll.Arg.
- Parmelia conspersa var. leonora Linds.
- Parmelia conspersa var. multifida Flotow.
- Parmelia conspersa var. polita Flotow.
- Parmelia conspersa var. polyphylla Müll.Arg.
- Parmelia conspersa var. stenophylla Ach.
- Parmelia conspersa var. subconspersa Stein.
- Parmelia conspersa var. thamnidiella Stizenb.
- Parmelia conspersula Nyl.
- Parmelia constrictans Nyl.
- Parmelia constrictans var. eradicata Nyl.
- Parmelia conturbata Müll.Arg.
- Parmelia conturbata var. exomata Zahlbr.
- Parmelia cooperi Steiner & Zahlbr.
- Parmelia coronata Fee var. denudata Wain.
- Parmelia cristifera Tayl.
- Parmelia cuprea Pers.
- Parmelia digitula Nyl. var. citrinireagens Gyeln.
- Parmelia digitulata var. esaxicola Gyeln.
- Parmelia digitulata var. esaxicola f. mitrovicensis Gyeln.
- Parmelia domokosii Gyeln.
- Parmelia dregeana Hampe.
- Parmelia dubia Schaer.
- Parmelia ecaperata Müll.Arg.
- Parmelia endomiltodes Nyl.
- Parmelia euneta Stirt.
- Parmelia fas igii'a (sic) Ach.
- Parmelia fissurina Zahlbr.
- Parmelia formosa Fee var. latifolia Flotow.
- Parmelia fraxinea Ach.
- Parmelia fuliginosa Nyl.
- Parmelia glabra Nyl.
- Parmelia gracilescens Wain. var. angolensis Wain.
- Parmelia granatensis Nyl.
- Parmelia hababiana Gyeln.
- Parmelia hildenbrandtii Krempelh. f. nuda Stizenb.
- Parmelia hildenbrandtii f. sorediosa Stizerb.
- Parmelia hildebrandtii var. nuda Müll.Arg.
- Parmelia hildebrandtii var. sorediosa Müll.Arg.
- Parmelia hottentotta Ach.
- Parmelia hottentotta var. diachrosta Stirt.
- Parmelia hottentotta var. pachythalla Nyl.
- Parmelia hottentotta var. phalacrum Zahlbr.
- Parmelia hypocrea Wain.
- Parmelia hypoleia Nyl.
- Parmelia hypoleia f. crenata Nyl.
- Parmelia hypoleia var. crenata Nyl.
- Parmelia hypoleia var. tenuifida Nyl.
- Parmelia hypoleioides Wain.
- Parmelia hyporysalea Vain.
- Parmelia imitans Gyeln. f. protoimbricatoides Gyeln.
- Parmelia incisa Tayl.
- Parmelia insignata Stizenb.
- Parmelia interrupts (sic) Stizenb.
- Parmelia isidiza Nyl.
- Parmelia junodii Steiner.
- Parmelia laceratula Nyl. f. phricoides Stirt.
- Parmelia laevigata (Sm.) Ach. (1814), accepted as Hypotrachyna laevigata (Sm.) Hale (1975)
- Parmelia latissima Fee.
- Parmelia laxa Gyeln. f. laciniata Gyeln.
- Parmelia lecanoracea Müll.Arg.
- Parmelia leonora Spreng.
- Parmelia leonora var. multifida Flotow.
- Parmelia leonora var. platyphylla Massal.
- Parmelia lichinoidea Nyl.
- Parmelia lugubris Pers.
- Parmelia macleyana Müll.Arg.
- Parmelia majoris Wain.
- Parmelia melancholica Stainer & Zahlbr.
- Parmelia molliuscula Ach.
- Parmelia mottusca Ach.
- Parmelia molybdiza Nyl.
- Parmelia mougeotii Schaer.
- Parmelia mougeotii var. dealbata Massal.
- Parmelia mougeotii var. obscurata Müll.Arg.
- Parmelia mougeotina Nyl.
- Parmelia mutabilis Tayl.
- Parmelia namaensis Steiner & Zahlbr.
- Parmelia natalensis Steiner & Zahlbr.
- Parmelia nilgherrensis Nyl. (1874) accepted as Parmotrema arnoldii (Du Rietz) Hale (1974)
- Parmelia nitens Müll.Arg.
- Parmelia obscura Fr.
- Parmelia oleagina Stizenb.
- Parmelia olivacea Nyl.
- Parmelia olivacea Ach.
- Parmelia olivaria Th.Fr.
- Parmelia olivetorum Nyl.
- Parmelia olivetorum var. hyporysalea Wain.
- Parmelia omphalodes Ach. var. panniformis Ach.
- Parmelia omphalodes var. panniformis f. crinalis Hepp.
- Parmelia ostracoderma Ach.
- Parmelia owaniana Stirt.
- Parmelia pachythala Spreng.
- Parmelia parietina Ach.
- Parmelia perfissa Steiner & Zahlbr.
- Parmelia perforata Ach.
- Parmelia perforata f. ciliata Flotow.
- Parmelia perforata var. cetrata Fr.
- Parmelia perforata var. ciliata Nyl.
- Parmelia perisidiosa Nyl.
- Parmelia perlata (Huds.) Ach. (1803) accepted as Parmotrema perlatum (Huds.) M.Choisy (1952)
- Parmelia perlata var. ciliata Duby. f. sorediifera Müll.Arg.
- Parmelia perlata f. sorediifera Stizenb.
- Parmelia perplexa Stizenb.
- Parmelia perrugata Nyl.
- Parmelia perspersa Stizenb.
- Parmelia persulphurata Nyl.
- Parmelia phaeophana Stirt.
- Parmelia phaeophana var. stenotera Stirt.
- Parmelia pilosa Stizenb.
- Parmelia pilosella Hue.
- Parmelia plumbea Ach.
- Parmelia praetervisa Müll.Arg.
- Parmelia proboscidea Tayl.
- Parmelia proboscidea var. sorediifera Müll.Arg.
- Parmelia prolixa Rohl.
- Parmelia prolixa f. dendritica Nyl.
- Parmelia prolixa var. applicata Stizenb.
- Parmelia prolixula Nyl.
- Parmelia pseudoconspersa Gyeln.
- Parmelia quercina Ach.
- Parmelia quercina f. cupiseda Wain.
- Parmelia quercina var. rimulosa Zahlbr.
- Parmelia resupina Stirt.
- Parmelia reterimulosa Steiner & Zahlbr.
- Parmelia reticulata Tayl.
- Parmelia revoluta Floerke.
- Parmelia roccella var. hypomecha Ach.
- Parmelia rubiginosa Ach.
- Parmelia rudecta Ach. (1814) accepted as Punctelia rudecta (Ach.) Krog (1982)
- Parmelia rudecta var. microphyllina Nyl.
- Parmelia saxatilis Ach.
- Parmelia saxeti Stizenb.
- Parmelia scabrosa Taylor (1847) accepted as Xanthoparmelia scabrosa (Taylor) Hale (1974)
- Parmelia sehenckiana Müll.Arg.
- Parmelia schenckiana f. imperfecta Gyeln.
- Parmelia schenckiana f. perfecta Gyeln.
- Parmelia schenckiana var. chalybaeizans Steiner & Zahlbr.
- Parmelia schreuderiana Gyeln.
- Parmelia scopulorum f. cornuata Ach.
- Parmelia scortea Ach.
- Parmelia sinuosa Ach.
- Parmelia soredians Nyl.
- Parmelia sphaerospora Nyl.
- Parmelia squamans Stizenb.
- Parmelia squamariata Nyl.
- Parmelia squamariata f. cinerascens Nyl.
- Parmelia standaertii Gyeln. var. africana Gyeln.
- Parmelia steineri Gyeln.
- Parmelia stellaris Ach.
- Parmelia stenophylla du Rietz f. hypomelaena Vain.
- Parmelia stenophylloides Wain.
- Parmelia stictella Massal.
- Parmelia subaequans Nyl.
- Parmelia subcaperatula Nyl.
- Parmelia subconspersa Nyl.
- Parmelia subconspersa f. lobulifera Gyeln.
- Parmelia subconspersa var. africana Gyeln.
- Parmelia subconspersa var. benguellensis Wain
- Parmelia subconspersa var. incisa Stizenb.
- Parmelia subconspersa var. thamnidiella Stizenb.
- Parmelia subcrustacea Gyeln.
- Parmelia subdecipiens Vain.
- Parmelia subflabellata Steiner.
- Parmelia sublaevigata Nyl.
- Parmelia subquercina Müll.Arg.
- Parmelia subrudecta Nyl. (1886) accepted as Punctelia subrudecta (Nyl.) Krog (1982)
- Parmelia subschenckiana Gyeln.
- Parmelia subsinuosa Nyl.
- Parmelia suffixa Stirt.
- Parmelia synestia Stirt.
- Parmelia terricola Steiner & Zahlbr.
- Parmelia texana Tuck.
- Parmelia thamnidiella Stirt.
- Parmelia tiliacea Ach.
- Parmelia tiliacea var. rimulosa Müll.Arg.
- Parmelia tiliacea var. revoluta Krempelh.
- Parmelia tiliacea var. scortea Ducy.
- Parmelia tinctoria var. hypomecha Ach.
- Parmelia tinctorum Despr.
- Parmelia tortuosa Ach.
- Parmelia toxodes Stirt. (1878) accepted as Punctelia toxodes (Stirt.) Kalb & M.Götz (2007)
- Parmelia vanderbylii Zahlbr.
- Parmelia verruculifera Nyl.
- Parmelia worcesteri Steiner & Zahlbr.
- Parmelia xanthotropa Stirt.
- Parmelia zambesica Müll.Arg.
- Parmelia zollingeri Hepp (1854) accepted as Parmotrema zollingeri (Hepp) Hale (1974)

Family: Parmeliaceae (Lichens)

Genus: Parmeliella (Lichens)

- Parmeliella coelistina Zahlbr.
- Parmeliella corallinoides Zahlbr.
- Parmeliella plumbea Müll.Arg. accepted as Degelia plumbea (Lightf.) P.M.Jørg. & P.James (1990)

Genus: Parmentaria

- Parmentaria capensis Zahlbr.

Genus: Parmotrema (Lichens)

- Parmotrema perforata Massal.

Genus: Parodiella

- Parodiella brachystegiae P.Henn.
- Parodiella circinata Sacc.
- Parodiella congregata Syd.
- Parodiella grammodes Cooke
- Parodiella paraguayensis Speg.
- Parodiella perisporioides Speg.
- Parodiella perisporoiodes var. microspora Theiss. & Syd.
- Parodiella puucta Sacc.
- Parodiella schimperi P.Henn.

Family: Parodiellinaceae

Family: Parodiellineae

Genus: Parodiellinopsis

- Parodiellinopsis transvaalensis Hansf.

Family: Parodiopsidineae

Genus: Parodiopsis

- Parodiopsis brachystegiae Am.

Genus: Passalora

- Passalora protearum Kalchbr. & Cooke

Genus: Patella

- Patella albida Seaver.
- Patella coprinaria Seaver.
- Patella lusatiae Seaver.
- Patella scutellata Morg.

Genus: Patellaria

- Patellaria atrata Fr.
- Patellaria incamata Ach.
- Patellaria leprolyta Müll.Arg.

Family: Patellariaceae

Genus: Patouillardia

- Patouillardia rumicis Verw. & du Pless.

Genus: Paxillus

- Paxillus atraetopus Kalchbr.
- Paxillus extenuatus Fr.
- Paxillus involutus Fr.
- Paxillus panuoides Fr. accepted as Tapinella panuoides (Batsch) E.-J.Gilbert (1931)

== Pe ==
Genus: Peccania

- Peccania minuscula Zahlbr.

Genus: Peltigera (Lichens)

- Peltigera canina Willd.
- Peltigera canina f. leucorrhiza Floerke.
- Peltigera canina f. membranacea Duby.
- Peltigera ceranoides Spreng.
- Peltigera malacea Funck.
- Peltigera membranacea Nyl.
- Peltigera polydactyla Hoffm.
- Peltigera polydactyla f. hymenina Flotow.

Family:Peltigeraceae (Lichens)

Genus: Penicillium

- Penicillium acidoferum Sopp.
- Penicillium adametzi Zal.
- Penicillium brevi-compactum Dierckx.
- Penicillium citrinum Thom.
- Penicillium coryphilum Dierckx.
- Penicillium cyclopium Westling, (1911), accepted as Penicillium aurantiogriseum Dierckx, (1901)
- Penicillium digitatum Sacc.
- Penicillium digitatum var. californicum Thom
- Penicillium divaricatum Thom
- Penicillium duclauxii Delacr.
- Penicillium elongatum Dierckx. accepted as Penicillium rugulosum Thom, C. 1910
- Penicillium expansum Link emend. Thom
- Penicillium funiculosum Thom.
- Penicillium gilmanii Thom accepted as Penicillium restrictum Gilman, J.C.; Abbott, E.V. 1927
- Penicillium gladioli Machacek.
- Penicillium glaucum Link.
- Penicillium gratioti Sartory.
- Penicillium guttulosum Abbott. accepted as Penicillium simplicissimum Thom, C. 1930
- Penicillium hagemi K.M. Zalessky (1927), accepted as Penicillium brevicompactum Dierckx, 1901
- Penicillium intricatum Thom. acceptes as Penicillium westlingii Zalessky, K.M. 1927
- Penicillium italicum Wehm.
- Penicillium janthinellum Biourge. accepted as Penicillium simplicissimum Thom, C. 1930
- Penicillium lanosum Westling. accepted as Penicillium kojigenum Smith, G. 1961
- Penicillium luteo-viride Biourge.
- Penicillium luteum Zukal.
- Penicillium luteum (series).
- Penicillium notatum Westling. accepted as Penicillium chrysogenum Thom (1910)
- Penicillium oxalicum Currie & Thom.
- Penicillium palitans Westling.
- Penicillium petchii Sartory & Bain.
- Penicillium pinophilum Hedgcock.
- Penicillium purpurogenum Stoll.
- Penicillium putterillii Thom
- Penicillium roqueforti Thom
- Penicillium roseo-citrinum Biourge.
- Penicillium roseum Link. accepted as Clonostachys rosea f. rosea (Link) Schroers, (1999)
- Penicillium rugulosum var. aureomarginatum
- Penicillium simplicissimum Thom.
- Penicillium solitum Westling.
- Penicillium tardum Thom
- Penicillium verrucosum Dierckx.
- Penicillium viridicatum (series).
- Penicillium sp.

Genus: Peniophora

- Peniophora arenata Talbot.
- Peniophora atrocinerea Mass.
- Peniophora camosa Burt.
- Peniophora cinerea Cooke.
- Peniophora cremea Sacc. & Syd.
- Peniophora gigantea Mass.
- Peniophora glebulosa Sacc. & Syd.
- Peniophora incarnata Karst.
- Peniophora nuda Bres.
- Peniophora papyrina Cooke.
- Peniophora pruinata Burt.
- Peniophora purpurea Lloyd.
- Peniophora roumeguerii Bres.
- Peniophora setigera Bres. ex Bourd & Galz.
- Peniophora velutina (DC.) Cooke (1879) accepted as Phanerochaete velutina (DC.) Parmasto (1968)

Genus: Penzigia

- Penzigia discolor Miller.
- Penzigia verrucosa Miller.

Genus: Perichaena

- Perichaena corticalis Rost.
- Perichaena depressa Libert.
- Perichaena populina Fr.

Genus: Periconia

- Periconia doidgeae Hansf.
- Periconia pycnospora Fres.
- Periconia velutina Wint.

Genus: Periconiella

- Periconiella velutina Sacc.

Genus: Perischizon

- Perischizon oleifolium Syd.

Genus: Perisporina

- Perisporina melioliicola Doidge

Genus: Perisporium

- Perisporium irenicolum Doidge

Genus: Peroneutypella

- Peroneutypella cylindrica Berl.
- Peroneutypella infinitissima Doidge

Genus: Peronoplasmopora

- Peronoplasmopora cubensis Clint.

Genus: Pertusaria (Lichens)

- Pertusaria alpina Hepp.
- Pertusaria amara Nyl.
- Pertusaria amara var. capensis Steiner.
- Pertusaria ambigens Tuck.
- Pertusaria aperta Stizenb.
- Pertusaria casta Zahlbr.
- Pertusaria ceuthocarpa Fr.
- Pertusaria coccodes Nyl.
- Pertusaria commutans Vain.
- Pertusaria coriacea Th.Fr. var. obducens Zahlbr.
- Pertusaria cryptostoma Müll.Arg.
- Pertusaria diaziana Massal.
- Pertusaria dispersa Vain.
- Pertusaria duplicata Wain.
- Pertusaria elatior Stirt.
- Pertusaria enterostigmoides Zahlbr.
- Pertusaria euglypta Tuck.
- Pertusaria eyelpistia Massal.
- Pertusaria flavens Nyl.
- Pertusaria flavicunda Tuck.
- Pertusaria granulata Müll.Arg.
- Pertusaria granulata var. variolarioides Flotow.
- Pertusaria inquinata Th.Fr.
- Pertusaria laevigata Am
- Pertusaria laevigata var. laevigata Steiner.
- Pertusaria leioplaca DC.
- Pertusaria leioplaca var. octospora Nyl.
- Pertusaria leioplaca var. pycnocarpa Nyl
- Pertusaria leioplaca var. trypetheliiformis Nyl
- Pertusaria leioplaeella Nyl.
- Pertusaria leonina Stizenb.
- Pertusaria leucosoroides Nyl.
- Pertusaria limosa Zahlbr.
- Pertusaria mamillana Müll.Arg.
- Pertusaria melaleuca Duby.
- Pertusaria melanospora Nyl.
- Pertusaria microthelia Wain.
- Pertusaria multiplicans Vain.
- Pertusaria nivea Merrill.
- Pertusaria obducens Nyl.
- Pertusaria orbiculata Zahlbr.
- Pertusaria pustulata Duby.
- Pertusaria rhodesica Vain.
- Pertusaria spaniostoma Vain.
- Pertusaria subdealbata Nyl.
- Pertusaria subvelatula Vain.
- Pertusaria thiostoma Nyl.
- Pertusaria tropica Wain.
- Pertusaria trypetheliiformis Nyl.
- Pertusaria variolosa Müll.Arg.
- Pertusaria velata Nyl.
- Pertusaria vepallida Nyl.
- Pertusaria verrucosa Fee f. oligopyrena Wallr.
- Pertusaria wawreana Massal.
- Pertusaria wawreanoides Nyl.
- Pertusaria wilmsii Stizenb.
- Pertusaria xanthomelaena Müll.Arg.
- Pertusaria xanthothelia Müll.Arg.

Family: Pertusariaceae (lichens)

Genus: Pestalotia

- Pestalotia aloes Trinch.
- Pestalotia burchelliae Laughton.
- Pestalotia caffra Syd.
- Pestalotia camelliae Pass.
- Pestalotia cassinis Laughton.
- Pestalotia disseminata Thuem.
- Pestalotia encephalartos Laughton.
- Pestalotia evansii P.Henn.
- Pestalotia funerea Desm.
- Pestalotia oossypii Hori.
- Pestalotia guepini Desm.
- Pestalotia laughtonae Doidge.
- Pestalotia laurophvlli Laughton.
- Pestalotia maerochaeta Guva.
- Pestalotia mangiferae Henn., (1907), accepted as Pestalotiopsis mangiferae (Henn.) Steyaert, (1949)
- Pestalotia micheneri Guva. accepted as Pestalotiopsis microspora (Speg.) G.C. Zhao & N. Li
- Pestalotia milletiae Laughton.
- Pestalotia neglecta Thuem.
- Pestalotia ocoteae Laughton.
- Pestalotia palmarum Cooke (1876), accepted as Pestalotiopsis palmarum (Cooke) Steyaert, (1949)
- Pestalotia pelargonii Laughton
- Pestalotia peregrina Ell. & Mart.
- Pestalotia podocarpi Laughton
- Pestalotia psidii Pat.
- Pestalotia pterocelastri Laughton
- Pestalotia quercina Guba.
- Pestalotia rapaneae Laughton
- Pestalotia theae Shaw. (sic) possibly Sawada, (1915) accepted as Pseudopestalotiopsis theae (Sawada) Maharachch., K.D. Hyde & Crous, in Maharachchikumbura, Hyde, Groenewald, Xu & Crous, (2014)
- Pestalotia trichocladi Laughton
- Pestalotia versicolor Speg., (1879), accepted as Pestalotiopsis versicolor (Speg.) Steyaert, (1949)
- Pestalotia virgatula Kleb.
- Pestalotia watsoniae Verw. & Dipp.
- Pestalotia zahlbruckneriana P.Henn.
- Pestalotia sp.

Pestalozzia, see Pestalotia

Peyritschiellaceae

Genus: Peziza

- Peziza abietina Pers.
- Peziza africana v.d.Byl.
- Peziza aluticolor Berk.
- Peziza calyculaeformis Schum.
- Peziza cinerea Batsch ex Fr.
- Peziza coccinea Jacq.
- Peziza columbina Kalchbr. & Cooke
- Peziza cupularis Linn.
- Peziza cypliellum Kalchbr.
- Peziza epitricha Berk
- Peziza ferruginea Fr.
- Peziza lachnoderma Berk.
- Peziza Lusatiae Cooke
- Peziza nilgherrensis Cooke
- Peziza repanda Pers.
- Peziza rubella Pers.
- Peziza vesiculosa Bull.

Family: Pezizaceae

Order: Pezizales

== Ph ==
Family: Phacidiaceae

Order: Phacidiales

Genus: Phacidium

- Phacidium litigiosum Desm.
- Phacidium nitidum Welw. & Curr.

Genus: Phaeochorella

- Phaeochorella parinarii Theiss. & Syd.

Genus: Phaeodimeriella

- Phaeodimeriella asterinarum Theiss.
- Phaeodimeriella asterinicola Doidge
- Phaeodimeriella capensis Doidge
- Phaeodimeriella grewiae Hansf.
- Phaeodimeriella parvulum Hansf.
- Phaeodimeriella plumbea Doidge
- Phaeodimeriella psilostomatis Theiss.

Genus: Phaeodothis

- Phaeodothis lebeckiae Nel.
- Phaeodothis stenostoma Theiss. & Syd.
- Phaeodothis tristachyae Syd.

Genus: Phaeographina (lichens)

- Phaeographina caesiopruinosa Müll.Arg.
- Phaeographina limbata Müll.Arg.
- Phaeographina subfarinacea Zahlbr.

Genus: Phaeographis (lichens)

- Phaeographis conjungens Aahlbr.
- Phaeographis cryptica Zahlbr.
- Phaeographis inusta Müll.Arg.
- Phaeographis mesographa Müll.Arg.

Genus: Phaeophragmeriella

- Phaeophragmeriella meliolae Hansf.
- Phaeophragmeriella irenicola Hansf.
- Phaeophragmeriella transvaalensis Hansf.

Genus: Phaeospherella

- Phaeospherella eongregata Doidge
- Phaeospherella prinarii Theiss. & Syd.
- Phaeospherella senniana Sacc.

Genus: Phaeostigme

- Phaeostigme circumsedens Doidge

Family: Phallaceae

Order: Phallales

Genus: Phallus

- Phallus aurantiacus Mont.
- Phallus aurantiacus var. gracilis Fisch.
- Phallus campanulatus Berk.
- Phallus gracilis Lloyd.
- Phallus impudicus Linn, ex Pers.
- Phallus indusiatus Vent, ex Pers.
- Phallus rubicundus Fr.
- Phallus rugulosus Lloyd
- Phallus tunicatus Schlecht.

Genus: Pharcidia

- Pharcidia psorae Wint.

Genus: Phellorina

- Phellorina delastrei Ed.Fisch.
- Phellorina inquinans Berk.
- Phellorina squamosa Kalchbr. & MacOwan
- Phellorina strobilina Kalchbr.

Genus: Phillipsia

- Phillipsia domingensis Berk.
- Phillipsia kermesina Kalchbr. & Cooke

Genus: Philonectria

- Philonectria ugandensis Hansf.

Genus: Phlebia

- Phlebia strigoso-zonata Lloyd

Genus: Phlebopus

- Phlebopus capensis Sing.

Genus: Phlyctella

- Phlyctella andensis Nyl.
- Phlyctella capillaris Stizenb.

Genus: Phlyctidia

- Phlyctidia boliviensis Müll.Arg.

Genus: Phlyctis (lichens)

- Phlyctis argena Flotow.
- Phlyctis boliviensis Nyl.
- Phlyctis candida Zahlbr.
- Phlyctis capillaris Stirt.

Genus: Pholiota

- Pholiota aurivella Quel.
- Pholiota cylindracea Gill.
- Pholiota dura Quel.
- Pholiota flammans Quel.
- Pholiota mutabilis Quel. (sic) could be (Schaeff.) P.Kumm. (1871),accepted as Kuehneromyces mutabilis (Schaeff.) Singer & A.H.Sm. (1946)
- Pholiota mycenoides Quel.
- Pholiota spectabilis Quel.
- Pholiota togularis Quel.
- Pholiota unicolor Gill.

Genus: Phoma

- Phoma agapanthi Sacc.
- Phoma ampelinum de Bary.
- Phoma artemisiae Kalchbr. & Cooke
- Phoma betae A.B. Frank, (1892), accepted as Pleospora betae Björl., (1915)
- Phoma brassicae Sacc.
- Phoma caricina Hopkins.
- Phoma citricarpa McAlpine, (1899), accepted as Guignardia citricarpa Kiely, (1948)
- Phoma cyclospora Sacc.
- Phoma destructiva Plowr.
- Phoma fici-caricae Verw. & du Pless.
- Phoma flaccida McAlp.
- Phoma gaillardiae du Pless.
- Phoma geasteropsidis Hollos.
- Phoma glumarum Ell. & Tracy.
- Phoma insidiosa Tassi.
- Phoma lantanae Verw. & du Pless.
- Phoma lingam (Tode) Desm. (1849), accepted as Leptosphaeria maculans (Sowerby) P.Karst. 1873
- Phoma macrothecia Thuem.
- Phoma oleracea Sacc.
- Phoma omithogali Thuem.
- Phoma passiflorae Penz. & Sacc.
- Phoma persicae Sacc.
- Phoma pinastrella Sacc.
- Phoma pomi Pass.(sic), maybe Schulzer & Sacc. (1884), accepted as Mycosphaerella pomi (Pass.) Lindau, (1897)
- Phoma rostrupii Sacc. (1895),accepted as Leptosphaeria libanotis (Fuckel) Niessl (1876)
- Phoma sanguinolenta Rostr.accepted as Plenodomus libanotidis (Fuckel) Gruyter, Aveskamp & Verkley, in Gruyter, Woudenberg, Aveskamp, Verkley, Groenewald & Crous 2012
- Phoma stapeliae Kalchbr. & Cooke
- Phoma straminella
- Phoma subcircinata Ellis & Everh. (1893), accepted as Phomopsis phaseoli (Desm.) Sacc., (1915)
- Phoma tatulae Kalchbr. & Cooke
- Phoma terrestris H.N. Hansen, (1929),accepted as Pyrenochaeta terrestris (H.N. Hansen) Gorenz, J.C. Walker & Larson, (1948)
- Phoma tingens Cooke & Mass.
- Phoma welwitschiae Mass.
- Phoma zantedeschiae Dipp.
- Phoma sp.

Genus: Phomopsis

- Phomopsis cinerescens Trav.
- Phomopsis citri H.S. Fawc. (1912), accepted as Diaporthe citri F.A. Wolf
- Phomopsis daturae Sacc.
- Phomopsis juniperovora Hahn.
- Phomopsis mali Roberts (1912), accepted as Phomopsis prunorum (Cooke) Grove, (1917)
- Phomopsis oxalina Syd.
- Phomopsis papayae Frag. & Cif.
- Phomopsis perniciosa Grove.
- Phomopsis phaseolorum Grove.
- Phomopsis samarorum v. Hohn.
- Phomopsis sp.

Genus: Phragmidium

- Phragmidium albidum Ludw.(sic) possibly (J.G. Kühn) Lagerh. (1888)accepted as Kuehneola uredinis (Link) Arthur (1906)
- Phragmidium disciflorum James.
- Phragmidium longissimum Thuem.
- Phragmidium obtusum Tul.
- Phragmidium rosarum Fuckel, (1870), accepted as Phragmidium mucronatum (Pers.) Schltdl., (1824)
- Phragmidium subcorticium (Schrank) G. Winter, (1882), accepted as Phragmidium mucronatum (Pers.) Schltdl., (1824)
- Phragmidium violaceum Wint.

Genus: Phragmoeauma

- Phragmoeauma viventis Theiss. & Syd.

Genus: Phragmodothella

- Phragmodothella nervisequens Doidge

Genus: Phragmodothis

- Phragmodothis asperata Syd.

Genus: Phragmosperma

- Phragmosperma marattiae Theiss. & Syd.

Genus: Phragmothyriella

- Phragmothyriella parenchymatica Doidge

Genus: Phragmothyrium

- Phragmothyrium trichamanis v. Hohn.

Genus: Phycopsis

- Phycopsis africana Syd.

Genus: Phyllachora

- Phyllachora aberiae P.Henn.
- Phyllachora albizziae Cooke
- Phyllachora amaniensis P.Henn.
- Phyllachora anthistiriicola Syd.
- Phyllachora arundinellae Doidge.
- Phyllachora baumii P.Henn.
- Phyllachora bottomleyae Doidge
- Phyllachora brachypodii Roum. (1885),accepted as Phyllachora graminis (Pers.) Fuckel, (1870)
- Phyllachora brachystegiae Doidge
- Phyllachora burgessiae Doidge
- Phyllachora caffra Syd.
- Phyllachora capensis Doidge
- Phyllachora chloridicola Speg.
- Phyllachora chrysopogonis Syd.
- Phyllachora circinata Theiss. & Syd.
- Phyllachora crotonis Sacc.
- Phyllachora cynodontis Niessl.
- Phyllachora cynodontis var. chloridis P.Henn
- Phyllachora digitariae Syd.
- Phyllachora digitaricola Doidge.
- Phyllachora doidgeae Syd.
- Phyllachora dombeyae Syd.
- Phyllachora elyonuri Doidge.
- Phyllachora eragrostidicola Doidge
- Phyllachora eragrostidis Doidge
- Phyllachora evansii Syd.
- Phyllachora ficuum Niessl.
- Phyllachora gentilis Speg.
- Phyllachora goyazensis P.Henn.
- Phyllachora graminis Pers. (sic) (Pers.) Fuckel, (1870),
- Phyllachora grammica P.Henn.
- Phyllachora grewiae Theiss. & Syd.
- Phyllachora halsei Doidge.
- Phyllachora heterospora P.Henn.
- Phyllachora hieronymi P.Henn.
- Phyllachora howardiana Petrsk.
- Phyllachora kniphofiae Sacc.
- Phyllachora leptocarydii Syd.
- Phyllachora lessertiae Doidge.
- Phyllachora loudetiae Doidge.
- Phyllachora lucens Sacc.
- Phyllachora melianthi Sacc.
- Phyllachora melinicola Syd.
- Phyllachora microstegia Syd.
- Phyllachora minuta P.Henn.
- Phyllachora miscanthidii Doidge.
- Phyllachora morganae Doidge
- Phyllachora myrsinicola Doidge
- Phyllachora nervisequens Petrak.
- Phyllachora osyridis Cooke
- Phyllachora peglerae Doidge
- Phyllachora peltophori Syd.
- Phyllachora penniseti Syd.
- Phyllachora permutata Petrak.
- Phyllachora perotidis Doidge.
- Phyllachora plaeida Theiss.
- Phyllachora pretoriae Doidge.
- Phyllachora proteae Wakef.
- Phyllachora pterocarpi Syd.
- Phyllachora puncta Doidge
- Phyllachora repens Sacc.
- Phyllachora rikatliensis Petrak.
- Phyllachora sanguinolenta Theiss. & Syd.
- Phyllachora sanguinolenta var. microspora Syd.
- Phyllachora schizachyrii Doidge.
- Phyllachora schotiae Doidge.
- Phyllachora strelitziae Sacc. emend. Doidge
- Phyllachora striatula Theiss. & Syd.
- Phyllachora superba Doidge.
- Phyllachora tecleae Doidge.
- Phyllachora tephrosiae Syd.
- Phyllachora transvaalensis Doidge.
- Phyllachora tricholaenae P.Henn.
- Phyllachora winkleri Syd.
- Phyllachora woodiana Doidge.
- Phyllachora sp.

Family: Phyllachoraceae

Genus: Phyllachorella

- Phyllachorella rikatliensis Doidge

Genus: Phyllactinia

- Phyllactinia acaciae Syd.
- Phyllactinia combreti Doidge.
- Phyllactinia eorylea Karst.
- Phyllactinia erythrinae Doidge.
- Phyllactinia evansii Doidge.
- Phyllactinia rhoina Doidge.
- Phyllactinia sphenostylidis Doidge

Genus: Phyllopsora (lichens)

- Phyllopsora breviuscula Müll.Arg.
- Phyllopsora corallina Müll.Arg.
- Phyllopsora parvifolia Müll.Arg.
- Phyllopsora parvifolia var. fibrillifera Müll.Arg.
- Phyllopsora parvifolia var. pulvinata Steiner.
- Phyllopsora parvifoliella Müll.Arg.

Family: Phyllopsoraceae

Genus: Phyllosticta

- Phyllosticta aloes Kalchbr.
- Phyllosticta antirrhini Syd.
- Phyllosticta asplenii Jaap.
- Phyllosticta auriculata Kalchbr. & Cooke.
- Phyllosticta bauhiniae-reticulatae P.Henn.
- Phyllosticta begoniae Brun.
- Phyllosticta betae Oudem., (1877), accepted as Pleospora betae Björl., (1915)
- Phyllosticta brassicae West. accepted as Leptosphaeria maculans (Sowerby) P.Karst. 1873
- Phyllosticta canavaliae v.d.Byl
- Phyllosticta caricae-papayae Alleseh.
- Phyllosticta carissae Kalchbr. & Cooke
- Phyllosticta cepae Verw. & du Pless.
- Phyllosticta cephalariae Wint.
- Phyllosticta colae Verw. & du Pless.
- Phyllosticta degenerans Syd.
- Phyllosticta delphinii Clem.
- Phyllosticta dianthi West.
- Phyllosticta dioscoreae Cooke.
- Phyllosticta doxanthae Verw. & du Pless.
- Phyllosticta dryopteris Verw. & du Pless.
- Phyllosticta eriobotrvae Thuem.
- Phyllosticta ficicola Pat.
- Phyllosticta gossypina Ell. & Mart.
- Phyllosticta helvola Tassi.
- Phyllosticta hesperidearum Penz.
- Phyllosticta hibiscina Ell. & Everth.
- Phyllosticta idaecola Cooke.
- Phyllosticta latospora Verw. & du Pless.
- Phyllosticta magnoliae Saec.
- Phyllosticta mali Prill. & Delacr., (1890), accepted as Mycosphaerella pomi (Pass.) Lindau, (1897)
- Phyllosticta malkoffii Bubak.
- Phyllosticta medicaginis Sacc.
- Phyllosticta nemophilae Dipp.
- Phyllosticta nepenthecearum Tassi.
- Phyllosticta nicotianae Ell. & Everh.
- Phyllosticta odinae P.Henn. & Evans.
- Phyllosticta orbicularis Ell. & Everh.
- Phyllosticta owaniana Wint.
- Phyllosticta perseae Ell. & Mart.
- Phyllosticta persicae Sacc.
- Phyllosticta phaseolina Sacc.
- Phyllosticta prunicola Sacc.
- Phyllosticta psidii Tassi.
- Phyllosticta pyrina Sacc.
- Phyllosticta rhoina Kalchbr. & Cooke.
- Phyllosticta richardiae Halst.
- Phyllosticta rumicis Kalchbr.
- Phyllosticta solitaria Ell. & Everh.
- Phyllosticta sorghina Sacc. accepted as Leptosphaeria sacchari Breda de Haan, (1892)
- Phyllosticta stanhopiae Alleseh.
- Phyllosticta straminella Bres.
- Phyllosticta tabaci Pass.
- Phyllosticta terminaliae P.Henn.
- Phyllosticta theobromae Aim. & Cam.
- Phyllosticta violae Desm.
- Phyllosticta sp.

Genus: Phyllostictina

- Phyllostictina concentrica v. Hohn. var. lusitanica J.V. Almeida, (1903), accepted as Phyllosticta concentrica Sacc., (1876)

Genus: Physalospora

- Physalospora bersamae Syd.
- Physalospora bylii du Pless.
- Physalospora caffra Syd.
- Physalospora chaenostoma Sacc.
- Physalospora cliviae Syd.
- Physalospora cydoniae G. Arnaud, (1911)accepted as Peyronellaea obtusa (Fuckel) Aveskamp, Gruyter & Verkley, in Aveskamp, Gruyter, Woudenberg, Verkley & Crous, (2010)
- Physalospora dombeyae Syd.
- Physalospora malorum Shear, N.E. Stevens & Wilcox, (1924)accepted as Peyronellaea obtusa (Fuckel) Aveskamp, Gruyter & Verkley, in Aveskamp, Gruyter, Woudenberg, Verkley & Crous, (2010)
- Physalospora obtusa (Schwein.) Cooke, (1892), accepted as Peyronellaea obtusa (Fuckel) Aveskamp, Gruyter & Verkley, in Aveskamp, Gruyter, Woudenberg, Verkley & Crous, (2010)
- Physalospora perseae Doidge.
- Physalospora placida Syd.
- Physalospora sapii Doidge.

Genus: Physalosporina

- Physalosporina sutherlandiae Petrak.

Genus: Physarella

- Physarella oblonga Morg.

Genus:Physcia

- Physcia adglutinata Nyl.
- Physcia adglutinata var. pyrithrocardia Müll.Arg.
- Physcia adscendens Oliv.
- Physcia aegiliata Nyl.
- Physcia affixa Nyl.
- Physcia africana Müll.Arg.
- Physcia aipolia Hampe.
- Physcia aipolia var. acrita Hue.
- Physcia aipolia var. alnophila Vain.
- Physcia applanata Zahlbr.
- Physcia astroidea Nyl.
- Physcia eaesia Hampe.
- Physcia capensis deNot.
- Physcia chrysopkthalma DC.
- Physcia chrysophthalma var. capensis Nyl.
- Physcia chrysophthalma var. dijatata Stizenb.
- Physcia chrysopkthalma var. pubera Nyl.
- Physcia clementiana Kickx.
- Physcia confluens Nyl.
- Physcia crispa Nyl.
- Physcia crispa f. melanothalma Wain.
- Physcia dilatata Nyl.
- Physcia dimidiata Nyl.
- Physcia ectanoides Nyl.
- Physcia endoohrysea Hampe.
- Physcia endococcinea Nyl.
- Physcia erythrocardia Vain.
- Physcia exilis Michx.
- Physcia fibrosa Nyl.
- Physcia flammea Nyl.
- Physcia flammula Nyl.
- Physcia flavicans DC.
- Physcia flavicans var. exilis Nyl.
- Physcia flavicans var. minor Cromb.
- Physcia flavicans var. crocea Jatta.
- Physcia hispida Frege.
- Physcia holoxantha Nyl.
- Physcia hypoglauca Nyl.
- Physcia hypoleuca Tuck.
- Physcia hypoleuca var. granulifera Hue.
- Physcia integrata Nyl.
- Physcia integrata var. obsessa Vain.
- Physcia leucomela Michx.
- Physcia leucomela var. angustifolia Nyl.
- Physcia leicomela var. subcomosa Nyl.
- Physcia lychnea Nyl. var. semigranularis Stizenb.
- Physcia macryphylla Stizenb.
- Physcia melanocarpoides Vain.
- Physcia obesa Pers. f. caesiocrocata Nyl.
- Physcia obesa f. tenuior Stizenb.
- Physcia obscura Hampe.
- Physcia obscura var. chloantha Rabenh.
- Physcia obscura var. glaucovirens Zahlbr.
- Physcia ochroleuca Müll.Arg.
- Physcia parietina deNot.
- Physcia parietina f. albicans Müll.Arg.
- Physcia parietina var. aureola Korb.
- Physcia parietina var. ectanea Nyl.
- Physcia parietina var. rutilans Stizenb.
- Physcia perrugosa Stizenb.
- Physcia picta Nyl.
- Physcia picta f. erythrocardia Stizenb.
- Physcia picta f. isidiifera Nyl.
- Physcia picta var. erythrocardia Tuck.
- Physcia picta var. sorediata Müll.Arg.
- Physcia podocarpa Nyl.
- Physcia pulverulenta Hampe.
- Physcia pusilla Massal.
- Physcia setosa Nyl.
- Physcia setosa f. deminuta Cromb.
- Physcia setosa f. virella B.de Lesd.
- Physcia speciosa Nyl.
- Physcia speciosa var. dactyliza Nyl.
- Physcia speciosa var. granulifera Tuck.
- Physcia speciosa var. hypoleuca Nyl.
- Physcia stellaris Nyl.
- Physcia stellaris var. aipolia f. acrita Nyl.
- Physcia subpicta Nyl.
- Physcia syncolla Nyl.
- Physcia tenella DC.
- Physcia tribacoides Nyl.
- Physcia venustula Stizenb.
- Physcia villosa Duby.
- Physcia zuluensis Vain.

Family: Physeiaceae

Genus: Physma

- Physma byrsinum Müll.Arg.
- Physma calliearpum Hue.

Genus: Physoderma

- Physoderma maydis Miyabe.
- Physoderma zeae-maydis Shaw.

Genus: Physopella

- Physopella fici Arth.

Genus: Physospora

- Physospora rubiginosa Fr.

Genus: Phytophthora

- Phytophthora cactorum Schroet.
- Phytophthora citricola Sawada.
- Phytophthora cambivora Petri.
- Phytophthora cinnamomi Rands.
- Phytophthora citrophthora Leon.
- Phytophthora cryptogea Pethybr. & Lalf.
- Phytophthora hibernalis Came.
- Phytophthora infestans de Bary.
- Phytophthora parasitica Dast.accepted as Phytophthora nicotianae Breda de Haan, (1896)
- Phytophthora parasitica var. rhei G.H.Godfrey, 1923,accepted as Phytophthora nicotianae Breda de Haan, (1896)
- Phytophthora syringae Kleb.

== Pi ==
Genus: Piggotia

- Piggotia filicina Thuem.

Genus: Pilidium

- Pilidium eucleae Kalchbr. & Cooke.

Genus: Piline

- Piline africana Syd.

Family: Pilobolaceae

Genus: Pilobolus

- Pilobolus crystallinus Tode.

Family: Pilocarpaceae (Lichens)

Genus: Pilocarpon

- Pilocarpon leucoblepharum Wain. f. confluens Wain.

Genus: Pilophoron

- Pilophoron aciculare Nyl.

Genus: Pilula

- Pilula straminea Mass.

Family: Piptocephalaceae

Genus: Piricularia

- Piricularia oryzae Br. & Cav.

Genus: Pisolithus

- Pisolithus tinctorius (Pers.) Coker & Couch (1928), accepted as Pisolithus arhizus (Scop.) Rauschert (1959)

== Pl ==
Genus: Placosterella

- Placosterella rehmii Theiss. & Syd.

Genus: Placodium

- Placodium acaciae Vain.
- Placodium benguellense Wain.
- Placodium cinnabarinum Nyl.
- Placodium deminutum Müll.Arg.
- Placodium domingense Vain.
- Placodium elcgans DC.
- Placodium elegantissimum Vain.
- Placodium ferrugineovirens Vain.
- Placodium ferrugineum Hepp var. benguellensis Wain.
- Placodium ferrugineum var. miniaceum Tuck.
- Placodium ferrugineum var. pyrithromoides Vain.
- Placodium flavidulum Vain.
- Placodium flavorubens Nyl.
- Placodium leptopismum Vain.
- Placodium leptopismum f. discreta Vain.
- Placodium mastophorum Vain.
- Placodium perexiguum Müll.Arg.
- Placodium perexiguum Vain.
- Placodium poloterum Vain.
- Placodium psorothecioides Vain.
- Placodium punicae Vain.
- Placodium pyropoecilium Vain.
- Placodium scoriophilum Massal.
- Placodium sophodes Vain.
- Placodium subcerinum Vain.
- Placodium subranulosum Wain.
- Placodium sympageellum Vain.
- Placodium testacea-rufum Vain.
- Placodium thaeodes Müll.Arg.
- Placodium xanthophanum Müll.Arg.

Genus: Placynthiopsis (lichens)

- Placynthiopsis africana Zahlbr.

Genus: Plasmodiophora (cercozoa)

- Plasmodiophora brassicae Woronin, 1877,

Fanily: Plasmodiophoraceae

Genus: Plasmopora

- Plasmopora viticola Berl. & de Toni

Genus: Platygrapha (lichens)

- Platygrapha dirinea Nyl.
- Platygrapha septenaria Stizenb.

Genus: Plectania

- Plectania coccinea Puck.
- Plectania occidentalis Seaver.

Genus: Plectodiscella

- Plectodiscella veneta Burkh.

Genus: Pleiostomella

- Pleiostomella Halleriae Doidge

Genus: Pleomassaria

- Pleomassaria gigantea Syd.
- Pleomassaria grandis Syd.
- Pleomassaria peddieae Doidge

Genus: Pleonectria

- Pleonectria pseudotrichia (Schwein.) Wollenw. (1926) accepted as Nectria pseudotrichia (Schwein.) Berk. & M.A. Curtis, (1853)

Genus: Pleoravenelia

- Pleoravenelia deformans Maubl.

Genus: Pleospora

- Pleospora bilbergiae Verw. & du Pless.
- Pleospora camelliae Dipp.
- Pleospora dianthi de Not.
- Pleospora disrupta McAlp.
- Pleospora doidgeae Petdak.
- Pleospora dyeri Doidge.
- Pleospora gerberae Dipp.
- Pleospora gramineum Died.
- Pleospora herbarum Rabenh.
- Pleospora kentiae Maubl.
- Pleospora lanceolata Sacc.
- Pleospora ozyzae Catt.
- Pleospora refracta Sace.
- Pleospora tropaeoli Halst.
- Pleospora vulgatissima Speg.

Genus: Pleurage

- Pleurage Brassicae Kuntze.

Genus: Pleurotrema

- Pleurotrema trichosporum Müll.Arg.

Genus: Pleurotus

- Pleurotus applicatus Quel.
- Pleurotus atrocaeruleus Gill.
- Pleurotus aureo-tomentosus Sacc.
- Pleurotus eaveatus Sacc.
- Pleurotus olusilis Sacc.
- Pleurotus contrarius Sacc.
- Pleurotus flabellatus Sacc.
- Pleurotus gilvescens Sacc.
- Pleurotus limpidus Gill.
- Pleurotus olearius Gill.
- Pleurotus ostreatus Quel.
- Pleurotus perpusillus Gill.
- Pleurotus petaloides Quel.
- Pleurotus radiatim-plicatus Sacc.
- Pleurotus rudis Pilat.
- Pleurotus sciadium Sacc.
- Pleurotus sciadeum var. salmoneus Sacc.
- Pleurotus septicus Quel.
- Pleurotus striatulus Quel.

Genus: Plicaria

- Plicaria leiocarpa Curr.

Genus: Pluteolus

- Pluteolus reticulatus Gill.

Genus: Pluteus

- Pluteus cervinus Quel.
- Pluteus pustulosus Killerm.

== Po ==
Genus: Podaxis

- Podaxis aegyptica Mont.
- Podaxis carcinomalis Fr.
- Podaxis indica Spreng.
- Podaxis pistillaris Fr.
- Podaxis aegypticus Mont.
- Podaxis carcinomalis Fr.
- Podaxis elatus Welw. & Curr.
- Podaxis mossamedensis Welw. & Curr.
- Podaxis pistillaris Fr.

Genus: Podocrea

- Podocrea transvaalii Lloyd.

Genus: Podonectria

- Podonectria coccicola Petch.

Genus: Podosphaera

- Podosphaera leucotricha Salm.

Genus: Polyblastia (lichens)

- Polyblastia alba Müll.Arg.
- Polyblastia transvaalensis Müll.Arg.

Genus: Polyblastiopsis

- Polyblastiopsis alba Zahlbr.
- Polyblastiopsis transvaalensis Zahlbr.

Genus: Polycephalum

- Polycephalum aurantiacum Kalchbr. & Cooke

Genus: Polyplocium

- Polyplocium inquinans Berk.

Family: Polyporaceae

Family: Polyporoideae

Genus: Polyporus

- Polyporus acaciae Van der Byl, (1925), accepted as Schizopora flavipora (Berk. & M.A. Curtis ex Cooke) Ryvarden, (1985)
- Polyporus adustus Fr.
- Polyporus affinis Blume & T.Nees (1826), accepted as Microporus affinis (Blume & T.Nees) Kuntze (1898)
- Polyporus anebus Berk.
- Polyporus aneirinus Cooke (sic) possibly accepted as Oxyporus corticola (Fr.) Ryvarden, (1972)
- Polyporus aratoides Lloyd
- Polyporus aratus Berk.
- Polyporus arcularius Fr.
- Polyporus arenobasus Lloyd
- Polyporus argenteofulvus v.d.Byl
- Polyporus australiensis Wakef. accepted as Piptoporus australiensis (Wakef.) G. Cunn.
- Polyporus australis Fr., (1828), accepted as Ganoderma tornatum (Pers.) Bres., (1912)
- Polyporus baurii Kalchbr.
- Polyporus biformis Kiotzsch.
- Polyporus brumalis Fr.
- Polyporus caesius Fr.
- Polyporus callosus Fr.
- Polyporus capensis Lloyd.
- Polyporus carneo-fulvus Berk, ex Fr.
- Polyporus carneo-pallens Berk.
- Polyporus chilensis Fr.
- Polyporus chioneus Fr. (1815), accepted as Tyromyces chioneus (Fr.) P.Karst. (1881)
- Polyporus cinnabarinus Fr.
- Polyporus cladonia Berk.
- Polyporus clemensiae Sacc. & Trott.
- Polyporus colossus Fr.
- Polyporus conchatus Lloyd.
- Polyporus conchoides Lloyd.
- Polyporus confluens Fr.
- Polyporus confragosus v.d.Byl.
- Polyporus conjunctus Lloyd.
- Polyporus corticola Fr. (1821), accepted as Oxyporus corticola (Fr.) Ryvarden, (1972)
- Polyporus crispus Fr.
- Polyporus cristatus Fr.
- Polyporus cuticularis Fr.
- Polyporus devians Bres.
- Polyporus dichrous Fr. (1815),accepted as Gloeoporus dichrous (Fr.) Bres. (1912)
- Polyporus dictyopus Mont.
- Polyporus doidgeae Wakef.
- Polyporus durbanensis v.d.Byl
- Polyporus durus Jungh.
- Polyporus elegans Fr.
- Polyporus emerici Berk.
- Polyporus epilinteus Berk. & Br.
- Polyporus eylesii v.d.Byl
- Polyporus favoloides P.Henn.
- Polyporus ferruginosus Rostr.
- Polyporus fiabelliformis Fr.
- Polyporus flexilis v.d.Bylaccepted as Coriolopsis floccosa (Bull.) Murrill, (1903)
- Polyporus focalis Kalchbr.
- Polyporus fragilis Fr.
- Polyporus fruticum Berk. & Curt.
- Polyporus fumosus Fr.
- Polyporus gallo-pavonis Berk. & Br.
- Polyporus gibbosus Nees.
- Polyporus gilvus Fr.
- Polyporus glauco-effusus v.d.Byl.
- Polyporus glaucoporus v.d.Byl.
- Polyporus glirinus Kalchbr.
- Polyporus goetzii P.Henn.
- Polyporus grammocephalus Berk.
- Polyporus helvolus (Fr.)
- Polyporus heteroporus Fr.
- Polyporus hirsutulus Schw.
- Polyporus hirsutus (Wulfen) Fr. (1821),accepted as Trametes hirsuta (Wulfen) Lloyd (1924)
- Polyporus hirtellus Fr.
- Polyporus hispidus Fr. accepted as Inonotus hispidus (Bull.) P. Karst., (1880)
- Polyporus iqniarius Linn, ex Fr.
- Polyporus immaculatus Lloyd.
- Polyporus inconstans Kalehbr.
- Polyporus intactilis Lloyd
- Polyporus isidioides Berk.
- Polyporus leoninus Klotzsch.
- Polyporus livingstoniensis v.d.Byl accepted as Coriolopsis floccosa (Bull.) Murrill, (1903)
- Polyporus lucidus Leyss. ex Fr.
- Polyporus luteo-olivaceus Berk. & Br.
- Polyporus luteus Blume & Nees.
- Polyporus macowani Kalchbr.
- Polyporus mastoporus Lev.
- Polyporus megaloporus Mont.
- Polyporus tncleagris Berk.
- Polyporus mollicarnosus Lloyd
- Polyporus molluscus Karst
- Polyporus murinus Cooke
- Polyporus nanus Mass.
- Polyporus natalensis Fr.
- Polyporus nidulans Fr.
- Polyporus nigro-applanatus v.d.Byl
- Polyporus nigrolucidus Lloyd
- Polyporus occidentalis Klotzsch.
- Polyporus ochraceus Pers.
- Polyporus ochroleucus Berk.
- Polyporus ochroporus v.d.Byl.
- Polyporus osfreiformis Berk.
- Polyporus pancheri Pat.
- Polyporus patouillardi Theiss.
- Polyporus pectunculus Lloyd.
- Polyporus phocinus Berk. & Br.
- Polyporus picipes Fr.
- Polyporus pinsitus Fr.
- Polyporus pocula Berk. & Curt.
- Polyporus proteus Berk. accepted as Coriolopsis floccosa (Bull.) Murrill, (1903)
- Polyporus proteus var. imbricatus Berk. accepted as Coriolopsis floccosa (Bull.) Murrill, (1903)
- Polyporus pruinatus Klotzsch.
- Polyporus pubeseens Schum. ex. Fr.
- Polyporus raphanipes Wakef.
- Polyporus reniformis Morgan.
- Polyporus resinaceust Lloyd
- Polyporus reticulatosporus v.d.Byl
- Polyporus rheades Pers.
- Polyporus rhipidius Berk
- Polyporus robiniophila Lloyd
- Polyporus rudis Lloyd (sic)
- Polyporus rufescens Fr.
- Polyporus rugulosus Lev.
- Polyporus rusticus Lloydaccepted as Coriolopsis floccosa (Bull.) Murrill, (1903)
- Polyporus sacer Fr.
- Polyporus salisburiensis v.d.Byl
- Polyporus sanguineus (L.) Fr. (1821), accepted as Pycnoporus sanguineus (L.) Murrill (1904)
- Polyporus sanguinolentus Alb. Schw. ex Fr.
- Polyporus schreuderi v.d.Byl
- Polyporus schweinitzii Fr.
- Polyporus scruposus Fr.
- Polyporus sector Fr.accepted as Trichaptum sector (Ehrenb.) Kreisel (1971)
- Polyporus spadiceus Jungh.
- Polyporus subliberalus Berk. & Curt.
- Polyporus subpictilis v.d.Byl
- Polyporus subradiatus Lloyd
- Polyporus sulphureus (Bull.) Fr., (1821), accepted as Laetiporus sulphureus (Bull.) Murrill (1920)
- Polyporus tabacinus Mont.
- Polyporus telfairii Klotzsch.
- Polyporus trabeus (Pers.) Rostk. (1830), accepted as Gloeophyllum trabeum (Pers.) Murrill (1908)
- Polyporus transvaalensis v.d.Byl
- Polyporus trichiliae Van der Byl, (1922), accepted as Schizopora flavipora (Berk. & M.A. Curtis ex Cooke) Ryvarden, (1985)
- Polyporus umbraculum Fr.
- Polyporus undatus Pers.
- Polyporus undulatus Torrend.
- Polyporus vallatus Berk.
- Polyporus vaporarius Fr.
- Polyporus varius Fr.
- Polyporus veluticeps Cooke
- Polyporus velutinosus Lloyd
- Polyporus velutinus Pers. ex Fr.
- Polyporus vernicipes Berk.
- Polyporus versicolor (L.) Fr. (1821), accepted as Trametes versicolor (L.) Lloyd (1920)
- Polyporus versiporus Pers.
- Polyporus vibecinus Fr.
- Polyporus vibecinus var. antilopum Kalchbr.
- Polyporus vicinus Bres.
- Polyporus vicinus Lloyd (1924), accepted as Vanderbylia vicina (Lloyd) D.A.Reid (1973)
- Polyporus villosus sw. ex Fr.
- Polyporus vinctus Berk. (1852),accepted as Rigidoporus vinctus (Berk.) Ryvarden (1972)
- Polyporus vinosus Berk. (1852), accepted as Nigroporus vinosus (Berk.) Murrill (1905)
- Polyporus virgatus Berk. & Curt.
- Polyporus vittatus Berk.
- Polyporus vulgaris Fr.
- Polyporus xanthopus Fr.
- Polyporus zambesianus Lloyd
- Polyporus zonalus Fr.

Genus: Polyrhizon

- Polyrhizon bewsii Doidge
- Polyrhizon celastri Doidge
- Polyrhizon pterocelastri Doidge

Genus: Polysaccum

- Polysaccum crassipes DC.

Genus: Polystictus Fr. (1851)

- Polystictus affinis Fr.
- Polystictus affinis-concinnus Lloyd
- Polystictus aratus Cooke
- Polystictus argenteus Lloyd
- Polystictus azureus Fr.
- Polystictus baurii Cooke
- Polystictus beharensis Cooke
- Polystictus biformis Fr.
- Polystictus bulbipes Fr.
- Polystictus cinnabarinus Cooke
- Polystictus circinatus Cooke
- Polystictus coccineus Lloyd
- Polystictus cryptomeriae P.Henn.
- Polystictus detonsus Fr.
- Polystictus discipes Fr.
- Polystictus doidgei Lloyd
- Polystictus dybowskii Lloyd
- Polystictus elongatus Fr.
- Polystictus ecklonii Berk, ex Cooke accepted as Coriolopsis floccosa (Bull.) Murrill, (1903)
- Polystictus fergussoni Berk, ex Cooke
- Polystictus flavus Fr.
- Polystictus floccosus Fr. accepted as Coriolopsis floccosa (Bull.) Murrill, (1903)
- Polystictus funalis Fr.
- Polystictus gallo-pavonis Cooke
- Polystictus glaueo-effusus Lloyd
- Polystictus glaucoporus Lloyd
- Polystictus glirinus Cooke
- Polystictus helvolus Fr.
- Polystictus hirsutulus Cooke
- Polystictus hirsutus (Wulfen) Fr. (1821), accepted as Trametes hirsuta (Wulfen) Lloyd (1924)
- Polystictus hirtellus Fr.
- Polystictus inconstans Cooke
- Polystictus iodinus Fr.
- Polystictus lanatus Fr.
- Polystictus leoninus Fr.
- Polystictus luteus Fr.
- Polystictus macounii Lloyd
- Polystictus meleagris Cooke
- Polystictus meyenii Cooke
- Polystictus mimetes Wakef.
- Polystictus obstinatus Cooke
- Polystictus occidentalis Fr.
- Polystictus ochraoeus Lloyd
- Polystictus pectunculus Lev.
- Polystictus perennis Fr.
- Polystictus perennis var. simillimus Lloyd
- Polystictus pergameus Fr.
- Polystictus phooinus Cooke
- Polystictus pinsitus Fr.
- Polystictus polyzonus Cooke
- Polystictus proteus Cooke
- Polystictus pubescens Fr.
- Polystictus radiato-rugosus Bres.
- Polystictus regius Cooke
- Polystictus rugosissimus Torrend.
- Polystictus sacer Fr.
- Polystictus sanguineus Fr. accepted as Pycnoporus sanguineus (L.) Murrill (1904)
- Polystictus scorteus Fr.
- Polystictus spadiceus Cooke
- Polystictus stereinus Berk. & Curt.
- Polystictus stereoides Berk.
- Polystictus sjubiculoides Lloyd
- Polystictus subpictilis P.Henn.
- Polystictus tabacinus Fr.
- Polystictus torridus Fr.
- Polystictus ursinus Cooke (sic) (Link) Fr., (1821), accepted as Hexagonia hydnoides (Sw.) M.Fidalgo
- Polystictus vellereus Fr. (sic) (Berk.) Fr. (1851) accepted as Trametes hirsuta (Wulfen) Lloyd (1924)
- Polystictus velutinus Cooke
- Polystictus versicolor Fr.
- Polystictus villosus Cooke
- Polystictus vinosus Cooke (sic), (Berk.) Sacc. (1888) accepted as Nigroporus vinosus (Berk.) Murrill (1905)
- Polystictus vittatus Fr.
- Polystictus xanthopus Fr.
- Polystictus xanthopus-concinnus Lloyd
- Polystictus zonatus Fr.

Genus: Polystomella

- Polystomella caulicola Doidge

Genus: Poria

- Poria aneirina Cooke
- Poria attenuata Peck.
- Poria callosa Cooke
- Poria citrina Mass.
- Poria contigua Cooke
- Poria corticola Cooke (sic) possibly (Fr.) Sacc., (1886), accepted as Oxyporus corticola (Fr.) Ryvarden, (1972)
- Poria epilintea Cooke
- Poria epimiltina Lloyd
- Poria ferruginosa Karst.
- Poria lacticolor Murr.
- Poria laevigata Karst.
- Poria mollusca Cooke
- Poria obliqua Karst.
- Poria radula Cooke
- Poria ravenelae Cooke
- Poria rufitincta Berk. & Curt.
- Poria sanguinolenta Cooke
- Poria spissa (Schwein. ex Fr.) Cooke (1886), accepted as Ceriporia spissa (Schwein. ex Fr.) Rajchenb. (1983)
- Poria subliberata Cooke (sic), possibly (Berk. & M.A.Curtis) Sacc. (1888) accepted as Rigidoporus lineatus (Pers.) Ryvarden (1972)
- Poria umbrina Cooke
- Poria vaporaria Cooke
- Poria versipora Lloyd
- Poria vincta Cooke accepted as Rigidoporus vinctus (Berk.) Ryvarden (1972)
- Poria vulgaris Cooke

Genus: Porina (Lichens)

- Porina albella Müll.Arg.
- Porina dissipans Nyl.
- Porina euryspermum Zahlbr.
- Porina ferruginosa Müll.Arg.
- Porina knysnana Zahlbr.
- Porina tetracerae Müll.Arg.
- Porina variegata Fee.

Genus: Poronia

- Poronia doumetii Pat.
- Poronia oedipus Mont.
- Poronia punctata Linn, ex Fr.
- Poronia ustorum Pat.

Genus: Porothelium

- Porothelium incanum Sacc.

== Pr ==
Genus: Prillieuxina

- Prillieuxina acokantherae Ryan.
- Prillieuxina burchelliae Ryan.
- Prillieuxina mimusopsidis Ryan.
- Prillieuxina pterocelastri Stevens.
- Prillieuxina woodiana Ryan.

Genus: Protomyces

- Protomyces physalidis Kalchbr.

Family: Protomycetaceae

Genus: Protostegia

- Protostegia eucleae Kalchbr. & Cooke

Family: Protothyriae

Genus: Protothyrium

- Protothyrium tricalysiae Doidge

Genus: Protubera

- Protubera africana Lloyd

== Ps ==
Genus: Psaliota

- Psaliota abruptibulba Kauffm.
- Psaliota africana Fayod.
- Psaliota ambdensis Fayod.
- Psaliota arvensis Quel.
- Psaliota arvensis var. grossa Berk.
- Psaliota augusta Quel.
- Psaliota campestris Qu.
- Psaliota capestris var. alba W.G.Sm.
- Psaliota campestris var. pratensis Vitt.
- Psaliota campestris var. rufescens W.G.Sm.
- Psaliota comtula Qu.
- Psaliota dialeri Bres. & Torrend.
- Psaliota dulcidula Schulz.
- Psaliota exserta Rea.
- Psaliota kiboga P.Henn.
- Psaliota placomyces Kauffm.
- Psaliota pratensis Quel.
- Psaliota pratensis var. australis Berk.
- Psaliota rodmani Kauffm.
- Psaliota silvatica Quel.
- Psaliota sylvicola Morot.

Genus: Psathyra

- Psathyra corrugis Quel.
- Psathyra disseminata Fr.
- Psathyra noli-tangere Fr.
- Psathyra spadiceo-grisea Quel.

Genus: Psathyrella

- Psathyrella disseminata Quel
- Psathyrella gracilis (Fr.) Quél., (1872), accepted as Psathyrella corrugis (Pers.) Konrad & Maubl. 1949
- Psathyrella hydrophora Quel.
- Psathyrella prona Gill.
- Psathyrella subtilis Quel.
- Psathyrella trepida Gill.
- Psathyrella sp.

Genus: Pseudobalsamea

- Pseudobalsamea microspora Diehl & Lamb.

Genus: Pseudocyphellaria (lichens)

- Pseudocyphellaria aurata Wain.
- Pseudocyphellaria crocata var. isidialia Gyeln.
- Pseudocyphellaria gilva Malme.

Genus: Pseudographis

- Pseudographis chrysophylli Doidge.

Genus: Pseudodiscosia

- Pseudodiscosia dianthi Höst. & Laub.

Genus: Pseudopeziza

- Pseudopeziza medacsginis Sacc.
- Pseudopeziza ranunculi Fuck. f. ranunculi-pinnati Thuem.
- Pseudopeziza trifolii Fuck.

Genus: Pseudophyscia

- Pseudophyscia hypoleuca Hue var. colorata Zahlbr.
- Pseudophyscia speciosa Müll.Arg. f. sorediosa Müll.Arg.

Genus: Pseudopyrenula (Lichens)

- Pseudopyrenula papulosa Müll.Arg.

Genus: Pseudothis

- Pseudothis Pterocarpi Syd.

Genus: Pseudothyridaria

- Pseudothyridaria moroides Syd.

Genus: Pseudovalsa

- Pseudovalsa longipes Sacc.

Genus: Psilocybe

- Psilocybe areolata Sacc.
- Psilocybe atro-rufa Quel.
- Psilocybe atro-rufa var. montanus Pers. ex Fr.
- Psilocybe ericaea Quel.
- Psilocybe foenisecii Quel.
- Psilocybe semilanceata Quel.
- Psilocybe squalens Karst.
- Psilocybe taediosa Sacc.
- Psilocybe uda Gill.

Genus: Psoroma (Lichens)

- Psoroma asperellum Nyl.
- Psoroma sphinctrinum Nyl.

Genus: Psorotichia

- Psorotichia cataractae Zahlbr.
- Psorotichia fuliginella Wain.

== Pt ==
Genus: Pterula

- Pterula multifida Fr.
- Pterula penicellata Berk.

Genus: Ptychogaster

- Ptychogaster sp.

== Pu ==
Genus: Puccinella

- Puccinella eragrostidis Syd.

Genus: Puccinia (Rusts)

- Puccinia absinthii DC.
- Puccinia abutili Berk. & Br.
- Puccinia acalyphae Doidge
- Puccinia advena Syd.
- Puccinia aecidiiformis Thuem.
- Puccinia aethiopica Kalchbr. & Cooke
- Puccinia afra Wint.
- Puccinia africana Cooke.
- Puccinia alepideae Doidge
- Puccinia allii Rud.
- Puccinia amadelpha Syd.
- Puccinia amphilophidis Doidge
- Puccinia anomala Rostr. accepted as Puccinia hordei G.H.Otth (1871)
- Puccinia anthospermi Syd.
- Puccinia antirrhini Diet. & Holw.
- Puccinia aristidicola P.Henn.
- Puccinia arundinellae Barcl.
- Puccinia asparagi DC.
- Puccinia atropae Mont.
- Puccinia aurea Wint.
- Puccinia bakoyana Pat. & Har.
- Puccinia batatae Syd.
- Puccinia becii Doidge.
- Puccinia behenis Otth.
- Puccinia berkheyicola Doidge.
- Puccinia blasdalei Diet. & Holw.
- Puccinia blepharidis P.Henn.
- Puccinia borreriae Syd.
- Puccinia bottomleyae Doidge
- Puccinia bromina Erikss. 1899, accepted as Puccinia recondita Dietel & Holw. (1857)
- Puccinia bulbostylidis Doidge
- Puccinia bylianum Dipp.
- Puccinia callistea Syd.
- Puccinia canaliculate Lagerh. var. tenuis Doidge
- Puccinia capensis Diet.
- Puccinia capensis Syd.
- Puccinia carbonacea Kalchbr. & Cooke
- Puccinia caricina DC.
- Puccinia caricis-cemuae Doidge.
- Puccinia cephalandrae Thuem.
- Puccinia chaetacanthi Doidge
- Puccinia chloridis Speg.
- Puccinia chrysanthemi Roze.
- Puccinia cichorii Bell.
- Puccinia contecta Syd.
- Puccinia cookei de Toni.
- Puccinia coronata Corda.
- Puccinia coronifera Kleb.
- Puccinia cryptica Cooke
- Puccinia cyani Pass.
- Puccinia cynodontis Desm.
- Puccinia cyperi Arth.
- Puccinia cyperi-fastigiati Doidge.
- Puccinia cyperi-tagetiformis Kern.
- Puccinia cyperi-tagetifonnis var. africana Doidge
- Puccinia deformans Wint.
- Puccinia dehiscens Syd.
- Puccinia desertorum Syd.
- Puccinia dichondrae Mont.
- Puccinia dieramae Syd.
- Puccinia digitariae Pole Evans.
- Puccinia dimorpha Syd.
- Puccinia dimorphothecae Pole Evans.
- Puccinia discoidearum Link.
- Puccinia dispersa Erikss. & Henning 1894, accepted as Puccinia recondita Dietel & Holw. (1857)
- Puccinia drimiae v.d.Byl.
- Puccinia duthiei v.d.Byl.
- Puccinia eragrostidis-chalcanthae Doidge
- Puccinia eragrostidis-superbae Doidge
- Puccinia erythraeensis Pazschke.
- Puccinia eucomi Doidge
- Puccinia euphorbiae P.Henn.
- Puccinia evansii P.Henn.
- Puccinia exanthematica MacOwan.
- Puccinia exhauriens Thuem.
- Puccinia eylesii Doidge
- Puccinia fagarae Doidge
- Puccinia feliciae Doidge
- Puccinia fuirenella Doidge
- Puccinia galeniae Diet.
- Puccinia galerita Doidge
- Puccinia galiorum Link.
- Puccinia galopinae Cooke
- Puccinia gerberae Pole Evans.
- Puccinia gerbericola Doidge
- Puccinia gladioli Cast.
- Puccinia gladioli-crassifolii Doidge
- Puccinia glechomatis DC.
- Puccinia gnidiae Doidge
- Puccinia graminis Pers. (1794),
- Puccinia granularis Kalchbr. & Cooke
- Puccinia helianthi Schw.
- Puccinia helichrysi Kalchbr. & Cooke
- Puccinia hennopsiana Doidge
- Puccinia heterospora Berk. & Curt.
- Puccinia holosericea Cooke
- Puccinia hydrocotyles Cooke
- Puccinia hyperici Doidge
- Puccinia hypochoeridis Oud.
- Puccinia imperatae Doidge
- Puccinia inflorescenticola Pole Evans
- Puccinia ipomoeae Cooke
- Puccinia ipomoeae-panduratae Syd.
- Puccinia iridis Wallr.
- Puccinia isoglossae Doidge
- Puccinia junci Wint. var. africana Doidge
- Puccinia junci-oxycarpi Doidge
- Puccinia kalchbrenneri de Toni.
- Puccinia kalchbrenneri var. valida Doidge
- Puccinia kalchbrenneriana de Toni.
- Puccinia kentaniensis Pole Evans
- Puccinia koedoeensis Doidge
- Puccinia kraussiana Cooke
- Puccinia krookii P.Henn.
- Puccinia kuhnii Butler.
- Puccinia kyllingicola Doidge
- Puccinia lebeekiae P.Henn.
- Puccinia lemanensis Doidge
- Puccinia leonotidicola P.Henn.
- Puccinia letestui Maubl.
- Puccinia leucadis Syd.
- Puccinia liebenbergii Doidge
- Puccinia lindaviana P.Henn.
- Puccinia lippiivora Syd.
- Puccinia lolii E.Nielsen (1875), accepted as Puccinia coronata Corda (1837)
- Puccinia luandensis Syd.
- Puccinia luxuriosa Syd.
- Puccinia lychnidearum Puck.
- Puccinia lycii Kalchbr.
- Puccinia macowani Wint.
- Puccinia magnusiana Koem.
- Puccinia malvacearum Mont.
- Puccinia maydis Bereng.
- Puccinia mccleanii Doidge
- Puccinia melanida Syd.
- Puccinia menthae Pers.
- Puccinia menthae f. leonotidis Kalchbr.
- Puccinia mesembryanthemi MacOwan.
- Puccinia miscanthidii Doidge
- Puccinia momordicae Kalchbr.
- Puccinia monsoniae Doidge
- Puccinia moraeae P.Henn.
- Puccinia morganae Doidge
- Puccinia myrsiphylli Wint.
- Puccinia natalensis Diet. & Syd.
- Puccinia natalensis var. evansii Doidge
- Puccinia oahuensis Ell. & Everh.
- Puccinia ocimi Doidge
- Puccinia oedipus Cooke
- Puccinia oenotherae Vize.
- Puccinia ornilhogali Kalchbr.
- Puccinia ornithogali-thyrsoides Diet.
- Puccinia osyridicarpi Grove.
- Puccinia othonnae Doidge
- Puccinia pachycarpi Kalchbr. & Cooke
- Puccinia pallens Syd.
- Puccinia pallida Mass.
- Puccinia pegleriana Doidge
- Puccinia pelargonii Syd.
- Puccinia pelargonii-zonalis Doidge
- Puccinia penniseti Zimm.
- Puccinia pentactina Doidge
- Puccinia pentanisiae Cooke
- Puccinia pentanisiae var. pentagynae P.Henn
- Puccinia phragmitis Koem.
- Puccinia phyllocladiae Cooke
- Puccinia pienaarii Pole Evans.
- Puccinia plectranthi Thuem.
- Puccinia poarum Niels.
- Puccinia pogonarthriae Hopkins.
- Puccinia pole-evansii Doidge
- Puccinia polycampta Syd.
- Puccinia polygoni-amphibii Pers.
- Puccinia popowiae Cooke
- Puccinia pottsii Doidge
- Puccinia pretoriensis Doidge
- Puccinia printziae Thuem.
- Puccinia pruni-spinosae Pers.
- Puccinia pulla Kalchbr.
- Puccinia pulvinata Mass.
- Puccinia punctata Link.
- Puccinia purpurea Cooke
- Puccinia ranulipes Doidge
- Puccinia rhynchosiae Kalchbr. & Cooke
- Puccinia rottboelliae Syd.
- Puccinia rubigo-vera Wint. f. sp. tritici Eriks. & Henn.
- Puccinia rubiae Kalchbr. & Cooke
- Puccinia rufipes Diet.
- Puccinia salviae Ung.
- Puccinia salviae-runcinata Doidge
- Puccinia satyrii Syd.
- Puccinia schlechteri P.Henn.
- Puccinia schoenoxyphii Doidge
- Puccinia scleriae-dregeana Doidge
- Puccinia sorghi Schw.
- Puccinia spermacoces Berk. & Curt.
- Puccinia stellenboschiana v.d.Byl.
- Puccinia stoboeae MacOwan.
- Puccinia stoboeae var. woodii Syd.
- Puccinia stonemanniae Syd. & Evans.
- Puccinia striaeformis West.
- Puccinia tabernaemontanae Berk. & Br.
- Puccinia tabernaemontanae Cooke
- Puccinia tandaaiensis Hopkins.
- Puccinia tetragoniae McAlp. var. austro-africana Doidge
- Puccinia thunbergiae Cooke
- Puccinia torosa Thuem.
- Puccinia tosta Arth.
- Puccinia tragiae Cooke
- Puccinia transvaalensis Doidge
- Puccinia tristachyae Doidge
- Puccinia triticina Erikss. (1899),
- Puccinia trochomeriae Cooke
- Puccinia urgines Kalchbr.
- Puccinia vangueriae Doidge
- Puccinia vernoniae Cooke
- Puccinia vernoniicola P.Henn.
- Puccinia versicolor Diet. & Holw.
- Puccinia verwoerdiana v.d.Byl.
- Puccinia woodiana Doidge.
- Puccinia woodii Syd.
- Puccinia zeae Bereng.
- Puccinia zorniae McAlp.

Family: Pucciniaceae (Rusts)

Genus: Pucciniastrum

- Pucciniastrum agrimoniae Tranzsch.

Genus: Pucciniopsis

- Pucciniopsis caffra Wakef.
- Pucciniopsis sp.

Genus: Pucciniosira

- Pucciniosira dissotidis Wakef.

Genus: Pullularia

- Pullularia pullulans (de Bary & Löwenthal) Berkhout (1923), accepted as Aureobasidium pullulans (de Bary) G. Arnaud (1918)

== Py ==
Genus: Pycnocarpon

- Pycnocarpon amicta Xel.

Family: Pyrenidiaceae

Family: Pyrenocarpeae

Genus: Pyrenochaeta

- Pyrenochaeta vanillae Verw. & du Pless.

Genus: Pyrenodesmia

- Pyrenodesmia hampeana Massal.

Genus: Pyrenophora

- Pyrenophora avenae Ito
- Pyrenophora gramineum Ito
- Pyrenophora horrida Syd.
- Pyrenophora teres Drechsl.

Family: Pyrenopsidaceae

Genus: Pyrenopsis

- Pyrenopsis mackenziei Jones.
- Pyrenopsis robustula Müll.Arg.

Genus: Pyrenula (Lichens)

- Pyrenula aspistea Ach.
- Pyrenula cerina Eschw. f. expallens Zahlbr.
- Pyrenula cinerea Zahlbr.
- Pyrenula emergens Vain.
- Pyrenula henatomma Ach.
- Pyrenula knightiana Müll.Arg.
- Pyrenula laevigata Am. var. incusa Zahlbr.
- Pyrenula mamillana Trevis.
- Pyrenula marginata Hook.
- Pyrenula mastophora Müll.Arg.
- Pyrenula nitida Ach.
- Pyrenula nitidella Müll.Arg.
- Pyrenula obtecta Merrill.
- Pyrenula pleiomeriza Zahlbr.
- Pyrenula subducta Müll.Arg.
- Pyrenula subglabriuscula Vain. var. natalensis Vain.
- Pyrenula tesselata Ach.
- Pyrenula transparens Zahlbr.
- Pyrenula wilmsiana Müll.Arg.

Family: Pyrenulaceae

Genus: Pyronema

- Pyronema confluens Tul.
- Pyronema omphaloides Fuck.
- Pyronema sp.

Genus: Pyrenophora

- Pyrenophora avenae Ito
- Pyrenophora horrida Syd.

Family: Pyrenopsidaceae

Genus: Pyrenopsis

- Pyrenopsis mackenziei Jones.
- Pyrenopsis robustula Müll.Arg.

Family: Pyrenulaceae

Genus: Pythiacystis

- Pythiacystis citrophthora R.E. & E.H.Smith (1906), accepted as Phytophthora citrophthora (R.E. Sm. & E.H. Sm.) Leonian, (1906)

Genus: Pyxine (Lichens)

- Pyxine cocoes Nyl.
- Pyxine endoleuca Vain.
- Pyxine eschweileri Vain.
- Pyxine meissneri Tuck.
- Pyxine meissneri var. endoleuca Müll.Arg.
- Pyxine meissneri var. sorediosa Müll.Arg.
- Pyxine meissneri var. subobscurans Malme.
- Pyxine petricola Nyl.
- Pyxine rhodesiaca Vain.

== See also ==
- List of bacteria of South Africa
- List of Oomycetes of South Africa
- List of slime moulds of South Africa
- List of fungi of South Africa
  - List of fungi of South Africa – A
  - List of fungi of South Africa – B
  - List of fungi of South Africa – C
  - List of fungi of South Africa – D
  - List of fungi of South Africa – E
  - List of fungi of South Africa – F
  - List of fungi of South Africa – G
  - List of fungi of South Africa – H
  - List of fungi of South Africa – I
  - List of fungi of South Africa – J
  - List of fungi of South Africa – K
  - List of fungi of South Africa – L
  - List of fungi of South Africa – M
  - List of fungi of South Africa – N
  - List of fungi of South Africa – O
  - List of fungi of South Africa – P
  - List of fungi of South Africa – Q
  - List of fungi of South Africa – R
  - List of fungi of South Africa – S
  - List of fungi of South Africa – T
  - List of fungi of South Africa – U
  - List of fungi of South Africa – V
  - List of fungi of South Africa – W
  - List of fungi of South Africa – X
  - List of fungi of South Africa – Y
  - List of fungi of South Africa – Z
