= Penicillium rugulosum =

Scientific classification
- Kingdom: Fungi
- Division: Ascomycota
- Class: Eurotiomycetes
- Order: Eurotiales
- Family: Aspergillaceae
- Genus: Penicillium
- Species: P. rugulosum

Binomial name
- Penicillium rugulosum Thom, C. 1910

Type strain
- ATCC 10128, BCRC 31518, CBS 371.48 CCRC 31518, CDBB 808, CGMCC 3.4479, CMI 40041, FRR 1045, IMI 040041, KCTC 16050, KCTC 6441, LSHB Ad27, MUCL 31201, NCTC 592, NRRL 1045, QM 7661, Thom 46

Synonyms
- Talaromyces rugulosus, Penicillium elongatum, Penicillium chrysitis, Penicillium rugulosum var. atricolum, Penicillium rugulosum var. atricola, Penicillium concavorugulosum

Species of fungus

Penicillium rugulosum is an anamorph species of fungus in the genus Penicillium which produces inulinase, luteoskyrin and (+) rugulosin.
