= Pyrenophora avenae =

Scientific classification
- Kingdom: Fungi
- Division: Ascomycota
- Class: Dothideomycetes
- Order: Pleosporales
- Family: Pleosporaceae
- Genus: Pyrenophora
- Species: P. avenae

Binomial name
- Pyrenophora avenae S.Ito & Kurib. (1930)

Species of fungus

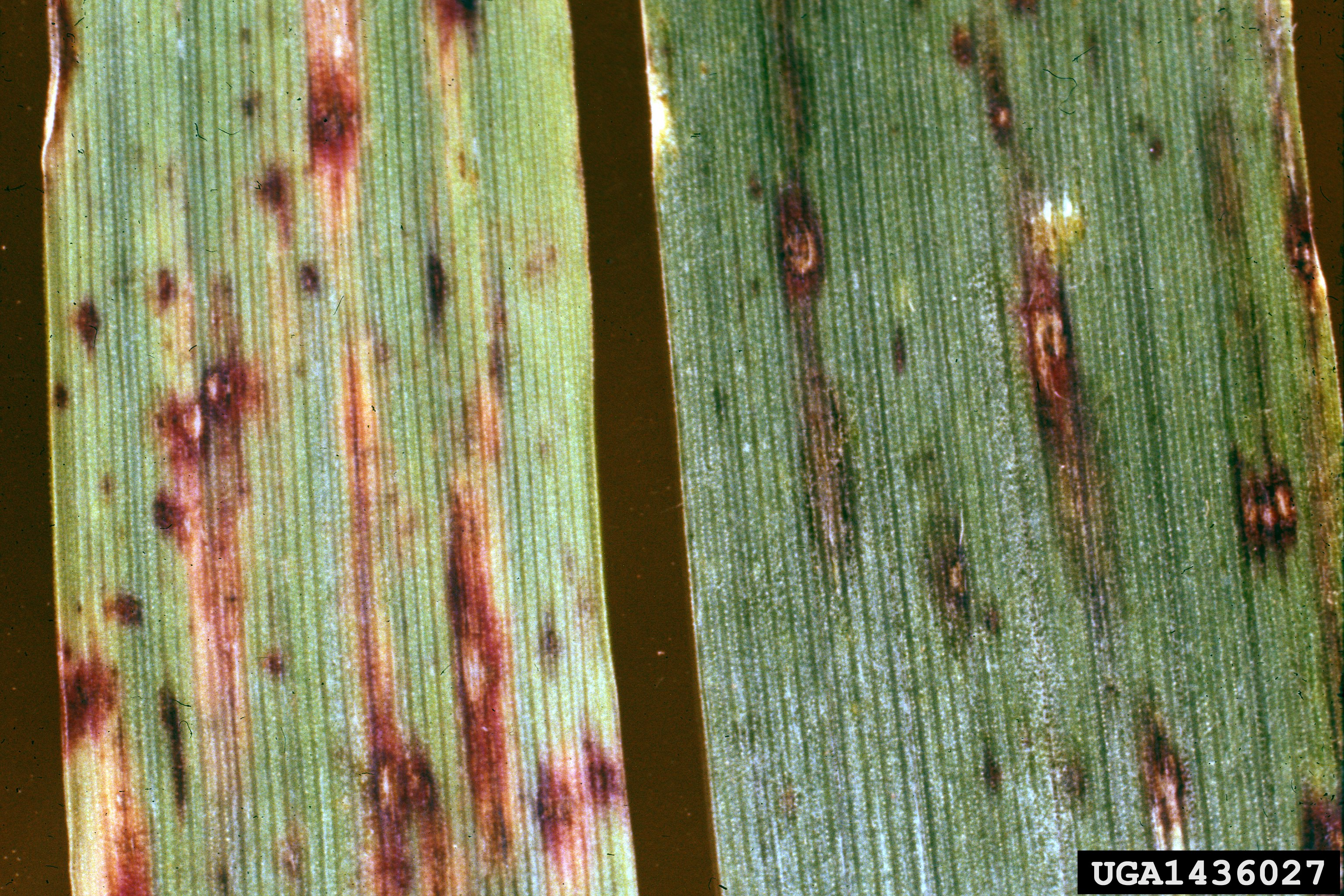

Pyrenophora avenae is a species of fungus in the family Pleosporaceae. It is a plant pathogen, causing leaf stripe, blotch or spot and seedling blight of oats.
