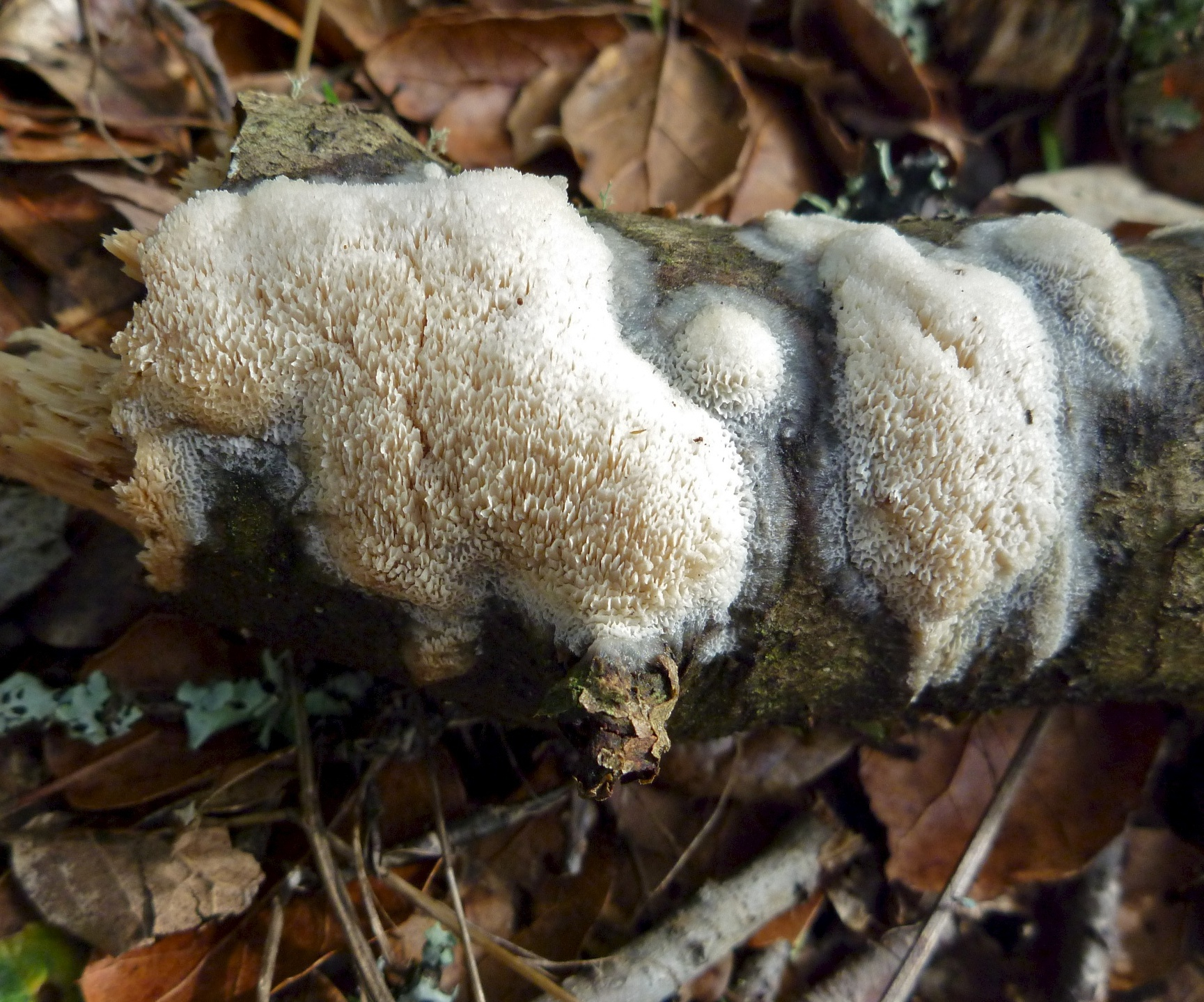

Scientific classification
- Domain: Eukaryota
- Kingdom: Fungi
- Division: Basidiomycota
- Class: Agaricomycetes
- Order: Hymenochaetales
- Family: Schizoporaceae
- Genus: Oxyporus
- Species: O. corticola

Binomial name
- Oxyporus corticola (Fr.) Ryvarden, (1972)

Synonyms
- List: Chaetoporus corticola (Fr.) Bondartsev & Singer, (1941); Chaetoporus corticola f. rostafinskii (P. Karst.) Bondartsev, (1953); Chaetoporus pearsonii (Pilát) Bondartsev, (1953); Coriolus corticola (Fr.) Pat., (1900); Muciporus corticola (Fr.) Juel, (1897); Oxyporus pearsonii (Pilát) Komarova, (1964); Physisporus corticola (Fr.) Gillet, (1878); Physisporus rostafinskii (P. Karst.) P. Karst., (1881); Physisporus tener Har. & P. Karst., (1890); Polyporus aneirinus sensu Fries (1828); (2005); Polyporus corticola Fr., (1821); Polyporus heteroclitus sensu auct.;(2005); Polyporus rostafinskii P. Karst., (1876); Polyporus salviae Berk. & M.A. Curtis, (1872); Polyporus separans Murrill, (1920); Poria corticola (Fr.) Sacc., (1886); Poria pearsonii Pilát, (1935); Poria salviae (Berk. & M.A. Curtis) Sacc., (1888); Poria separans Murrill, (1920); Poria vicina Bres., (1925); Rigidoporus corticola (Fr.) Pouzar, (1966)

= Oxyporus corticola =

Species of fungus

Oxyporus corticola Mycological characteristics
- Pores on hymenium
- No distinct cap
- Hymenium attachment is irregular or not applicable
- Lacks a stipe
- Spore print is white
- Ecology is saprotrophic or parasitic
- Edibility is inedible

Oxyporus corticola, commonly known as the boring poria, is a species of fungus. It grows on hardwood and conifer logs. It has also been documented infecting humans and dogs. It is inedible.
