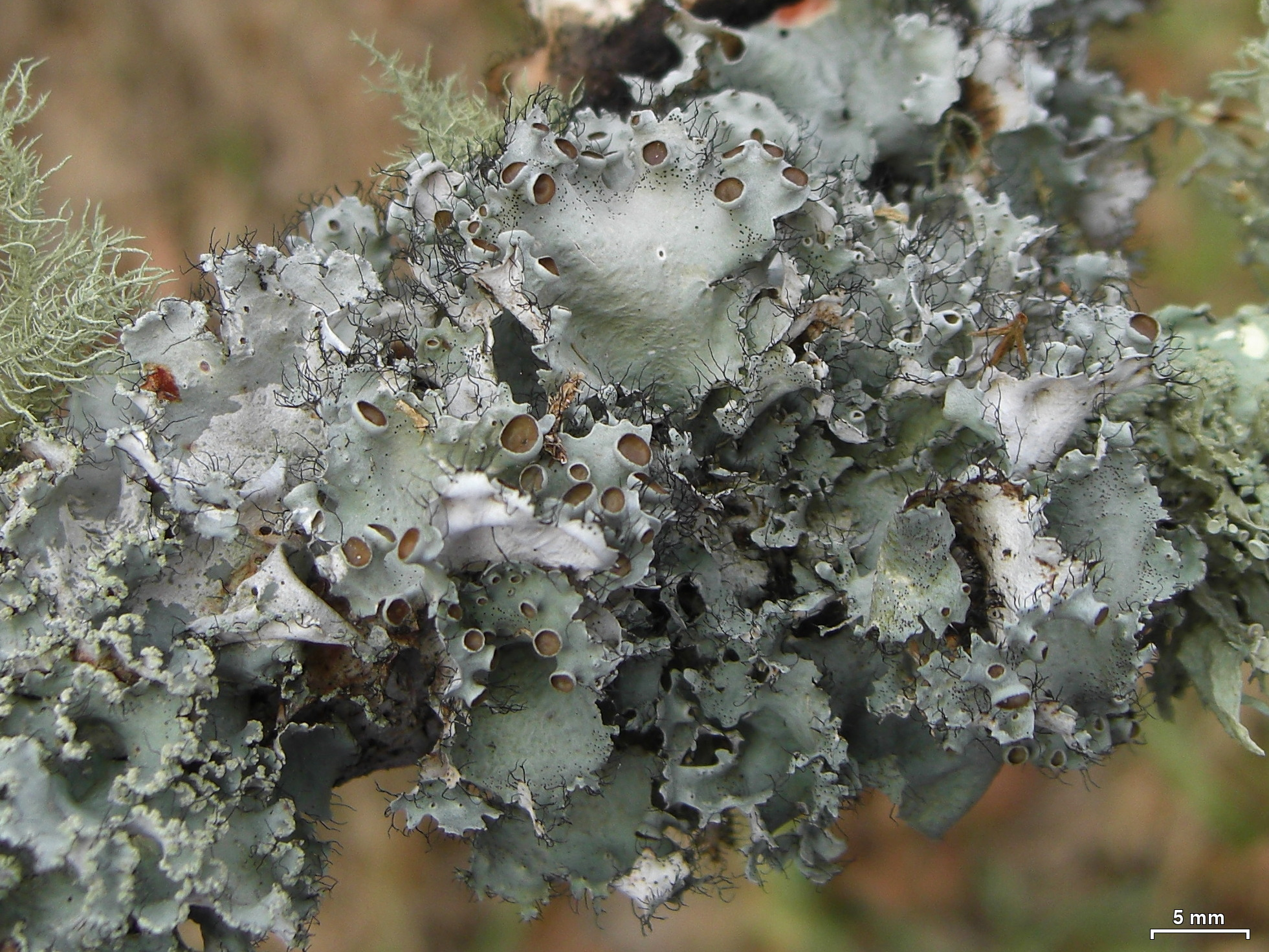

Conservation status
- Least Concern (IUCN 3.1)

- Apparently Secure (NatureServe)

Scientific classification
- Kingdom: Fungi
- Division: Ascomycota
- Class: Lecanoromycetes
- Order: Lecanorales
- Family: Parmeliaceae
- Genus: Parmotrema
- Species: P. perforatum

Binomial name
- Parmotrema perforatum (Jacq.) A.Massal. (1860)

Synonyms
- Lichen perforatus Jacq. (1787); Platisma perforatum (Jacq.) Hoffm. (1790); Lobaria perforata (Jacq.) Michx. (1803); Parmelia perforata (Jacq.) Ach. (1803); Imbricaria perforata (Jacq.) Körb. (1846); Parmelia perlata var. perforata (Jacq.) Koltz (1897)

= Parmotrema perforatum =

Species of lichen

Parmotrema perforatum, commonly known as the perforated ruffle lichen, is a species of foliose lichen in the family Parmeliaceae. The lichen was first formally described as new species in 1787 by Nikolaus Joseph von Jacquin. It was transferred to the genus Parmotrema by Italian lichenologist Abramo Bartolommeo Massalongo in 1860. The lichen is characterized by its apothecia (fruiting body) often having a perforated hole in the center. The genus Parmotrema has a naked (white) zone on the underside margin and often has long hair-like projections on the lobe edges called cilia; P. perforatum is no different. The thallus (lichen body) is gray and lacks the yellow-green tones that is seen in lichens with usnic acid. There are no asexual structures (soredia, isidia), but there are apothecia (the fungal sexual structures) that have the characteristic hole in the center.

== See also ==
- List of Parmotrema species
