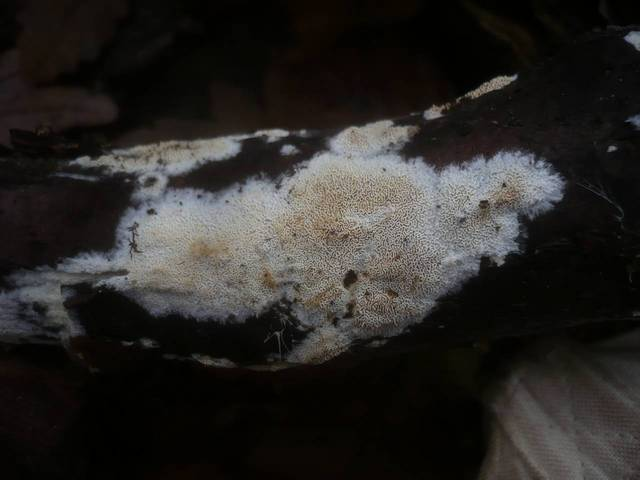

Scientific classification
- Kingdom: Fungi
- Division: Basidiomycota
- Class: Agaricomycetes
- Order: Hymenochaetales
- Family: Schizoporaceae
- Genus: Schizopora
- Species: S. flavipora

Binomial name
- Schizopora flavipora (Berk. & M.A. Curtis ex Cooke) Ryvarden, (1985)

Synonyms
- Aporpium confusum (Bres.) Bondartsev, (1953); Hyphodontia flavipora (Berk. & M.A. Curtis ex Cooke) Sheng H. Wu, (2000); Hyphodontia nongravis (Lloyd) Sheng H. Wu, (2000); Hyphodontia subiculoides (Lloyd) Sheng H. Wu, (2000); Polyporus acaciae Van der Byl, (1925); Polyporus lignicola Murrill, (1920); Polyporus nongravis Lloyd, (1919); Polyporus trichiliae Van der Byl, (1922); Polystictus subiculoides Lloyd, (1924); Poria confusa Bres., (1897); Poria flavipora Berk. & M.A. Curtis ex Cooke, (1886); Poria hypolateritia Berk. ex Cooke, (1886); Poria jalapensis Murrill, (1921); Poria lignicola Murrill, (1920); Schizopora hypolateritia (Berk. ex Cooke) Parmasto, (1968); Schizopora subiculoides (Lloyd) Ryvarden, (1972); Schizopora trichiliae (Van der Byl) Ryvarden, (1980); Tyromyces hypolateritius (Berk. ex Cooke) Ryvarden, (1980); Xylodon versiporus var. microporus Komarova, (1959)

= Schizopora flavipora =

Species of fungus

Schizopora flavipora is a plant pathogen infecting tea.
