= Pestalotiopsis versicolor =

Scientific classification
- Kingdom: Fungi
- Division: Ascomycota
- Class: Sordariomycetes
- Order: Amphisphaeriales
- Family: Sporocadaceae
- Genus: Pestalotiopsis
- Species: P. versicolor

Binomial name
- Pestalotiopsis versicolor (Speg.) Steyaert, (1949)

Synonyms
- Pestalotia versicolor Speg., (1879)

Species of fungus

Pestalotiopsis versicolor is a plant pathogen infecting avocados.
