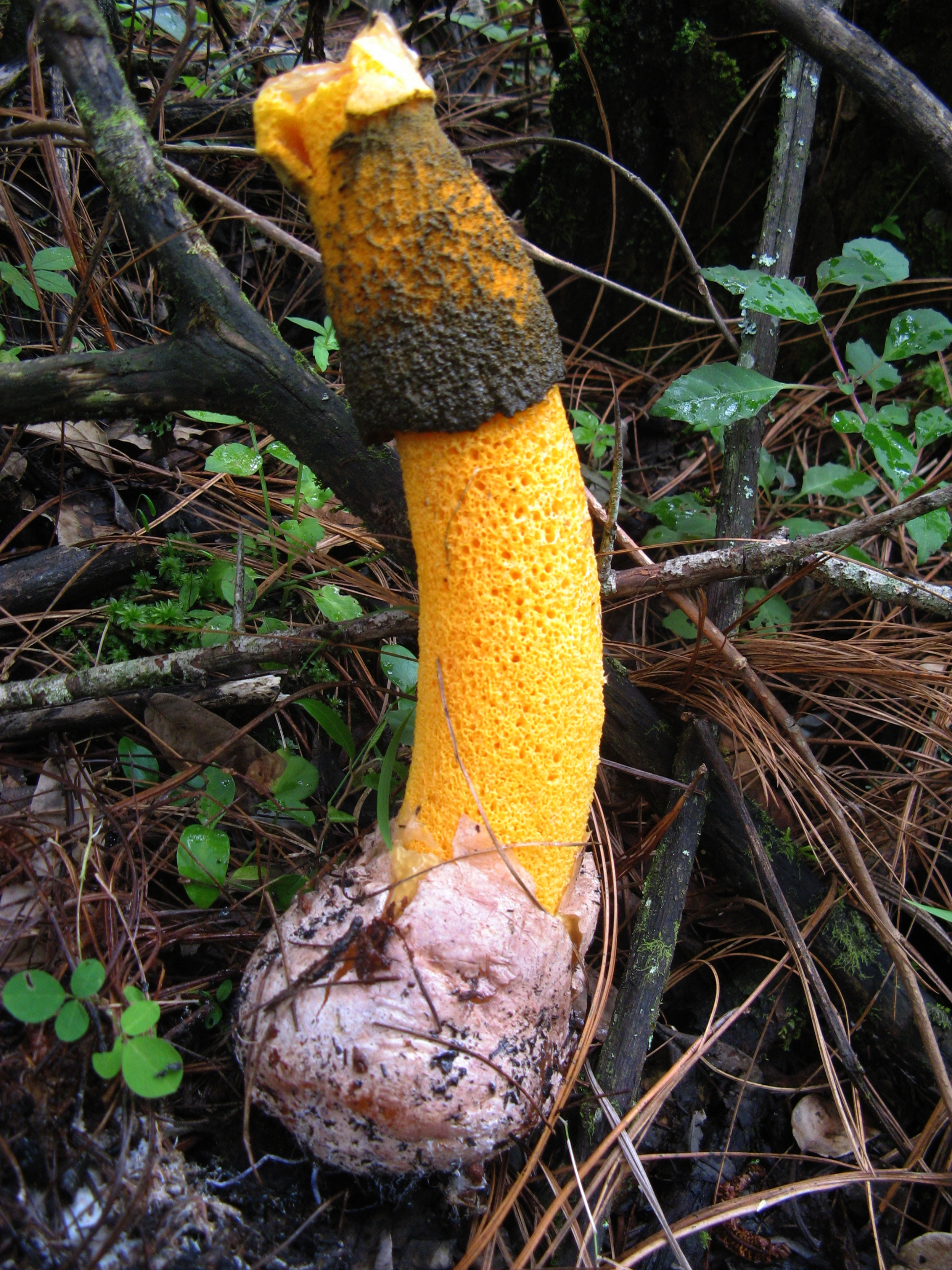

Scientific classification
- Domain: Eukaryota
- Kingdom: Fungi
- Division: Basidiomycota
- Class: Agaricomycetes
- Order: Phallales
- Family: Phallaceae
- Genus: Phallus
- Species: P. aurantiacus

Binomial name
- Phallus aurantiacus Mont. (1841)

Synonyms
- Dictyophora aurantiaca (Mont.) F.M.Bailey (1888); Ithyphallus aurantiacus (Mont.) E.Fisch. (1888)

= Phallus aurantiacus =

Stinkhorn fungus from Nigeria

Phallus aurantiacus is a species of fungus in the stinkhorn family. It has been found in Nigeria.

== Taxonomy ==
The species was first described in 1841 by Camille Montagne. Synonyms include Dictyophora aurantiaca and Ithyphallus aurantiacus.
