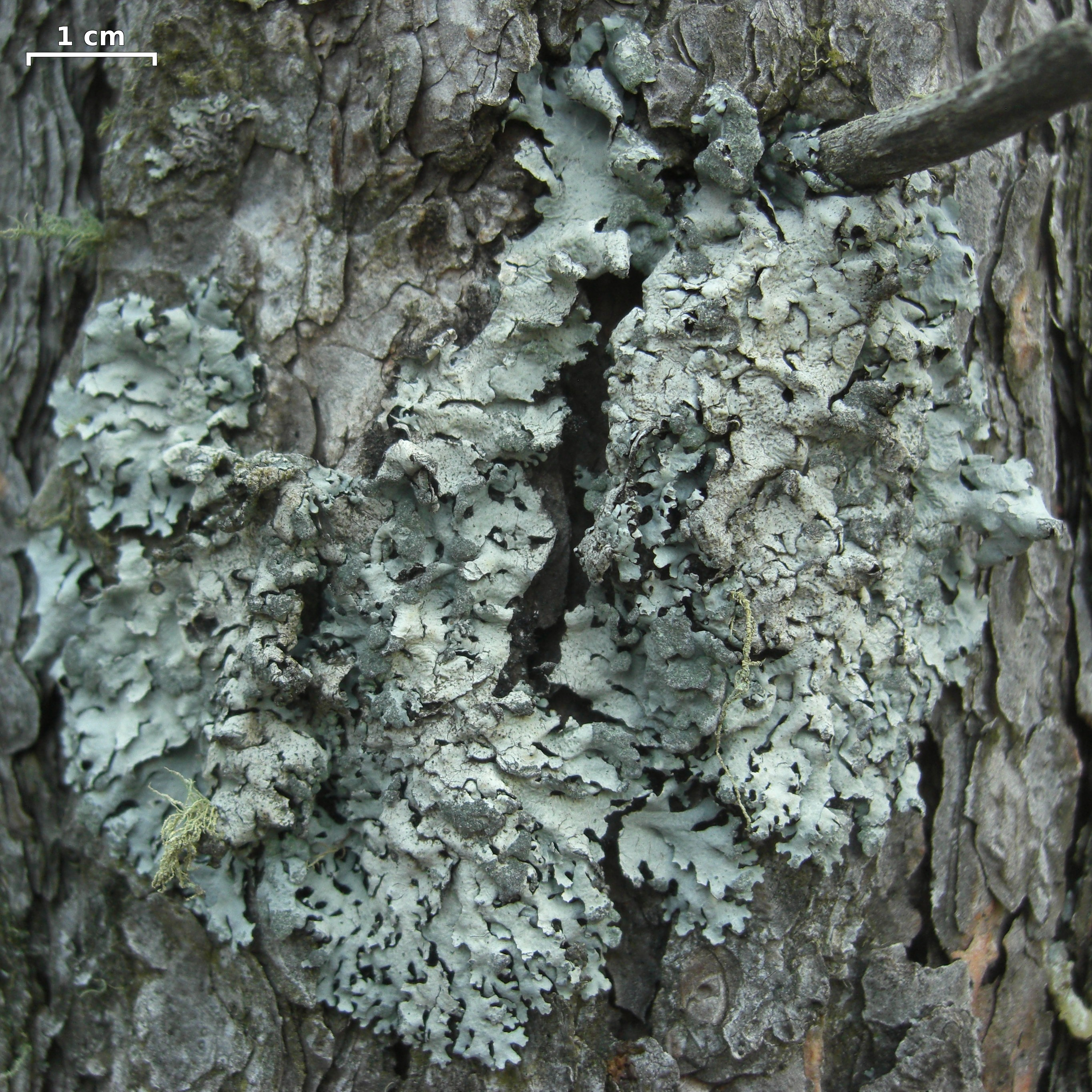

Conservation status
- Secure (NatureServe)

Scientific classification
- Kingdom: Fungi
- Division: Ascomycota
- Class: Lecanoromycetes
- Order: Lecanorales
- Family: Parmeliaceae
- Genus: Hypotrachyna
- Species: H. laevigata

Binomial name
- Hypotrachyna laevigata (Sm.) Hale (1975)

Synonyms
- Lichen laevigatus Sm. (1808); Parmelia laevigata (Sm.) Ach. (1814); Parmelia sinuosa var. laevigata (Sm.) Schaer. (1850); Imbricaria laevigata (Sm.) Arnold (1870); Parmotrema laevigatum (Sm.) M.Choisy (1952)

= Hypotrachyna laevigata =

Species of fungus

Hypotrachyna laevigata is a species of foliose lichen belonging to the family Parmeliaceae.

It has a cosmopolitan distribution.
