= Trichaptum sector =

Scientific classification
- Domain: Eukaryota
- Kingdom: Fungi
- Division: Basidiomycota
- Class: Agaricomycetes
- Order: Hymenochaetales
- Family: Hymenochaetaceae
- Genus: Trichaptum
- Species: T. sector

Binomial name
- Trichaptum sector (Ehrenb.) Kreisel (1971)

Synonyms
- Boletus sector Ehrenb. (1820); Coriolus sector Hirschioporus sector Inoderma floridanum Microporus floridanus Microporus fulvicolor Microporus ludens Microporus nebularis Microporus sector Microporus sordidissimus Polyporus floridanus Polyporus ludens Polyporus sector Polystictus fulvicolor Polystictus ludens Polystictus nebularis Polystictus sector Polystictus sector var. ludens Polystictus sordidissimus

Species of fungus

Trichaptum sector is a plant pathogen infecting sweetgum trees.
