= Penicillium restrictum =

Scientific classification
- Kingdom: Fungi
- Division: Ascomycota
- Class: Eurotiomycetes
- Order: Eurotiales
- Family: Aspergillaceae
- Genus: Penicillium
- Species: P. restrictum

Binomial name
- Penicillium restrictum Gilman, J.C.; Abbott, E.V. 1927

Type strain
- ATCC 11257, CBS 367.48, CGMCC 3.4477, FRR 1748, IAM 13682, IMI 040228, MUCL 38786, NRRL 1748, QM 1962, Wisc. 140

Synonyms
- Penicillium gilmanii, Penicillium kursanovii, Penicillium kurssanovii, Penicillium kazachstanicum

Species of fungus

Penicillium restrictum is a species of fungus in the genus Penicillium which was isolated from the stems of the plant Silybum marianum. Penicillium restrictum produces calbistrin A
