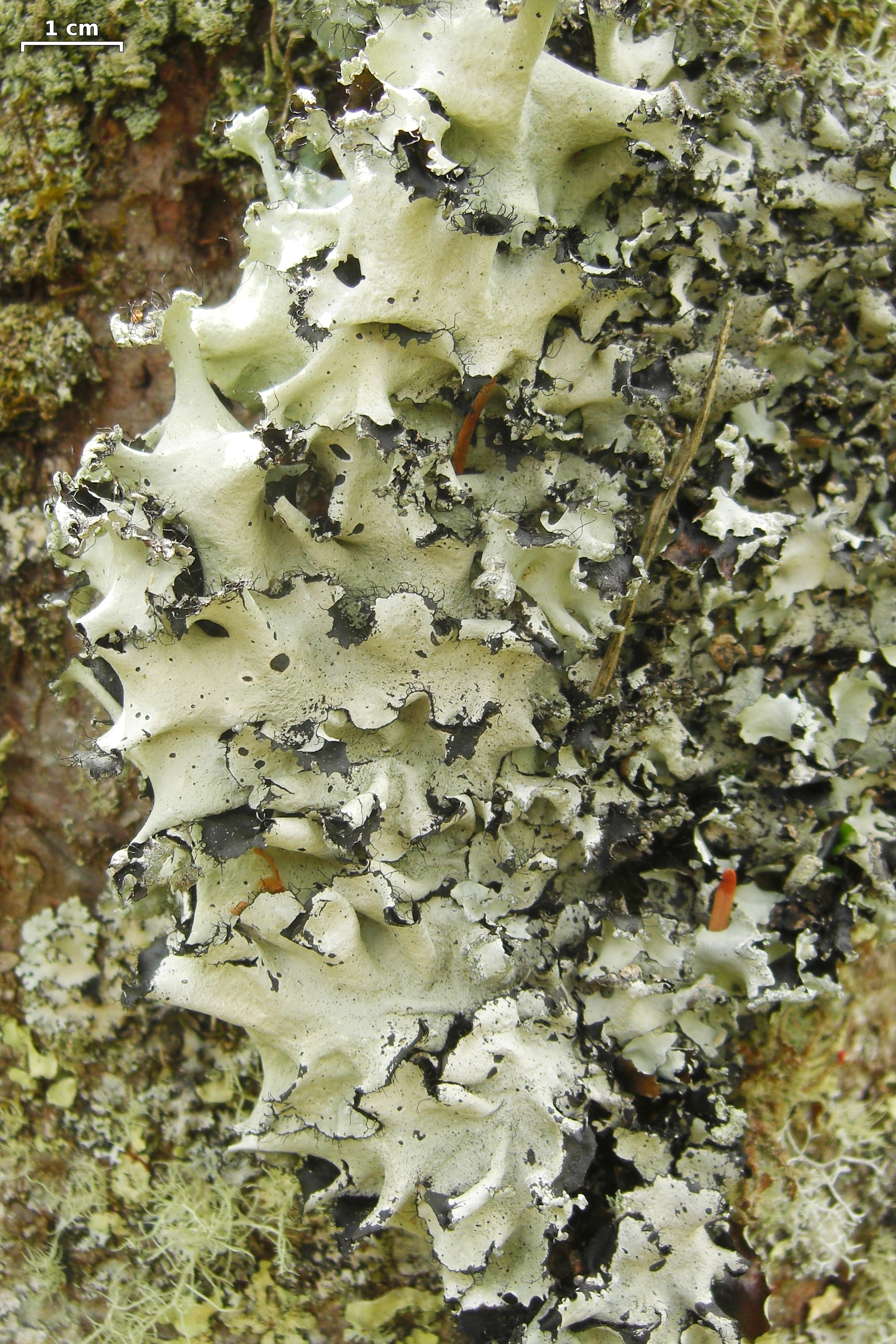

Conservation status
- Apparently Secure (NatureServe)

Scientific classification
- Kingdom: Fungi
- Division: Ascomycota
- Class: Lecanoromycetes
- Order: Lecanorales
- Family: Parmeliaceae
- Genus: Parmotrema
- Species: P. arnoldii

Binomial name
- Parmotrema arnoldii (Du Rietz) Hale (1974)

Synonyms
- Parmelia nilgherrensis Nyl. (1874); Imbricaria nilgherrensis Arnold (1875); Parmelia perlata var. nilgherrensis Boistel (1903); Parmelia arnoldii Du Rietz (1924); Parmelia subarnoldii Abbayes (1961)

= Parmotrema arnoldii =

Species of lichen

Parmotrema arnoldii, commonly known as the powdered ruffle lichen, is a widely distributed species of lichen in the family Parmeliaceae. It has been recorded from Africa, Asia, Europe, Oceania, Macaronesia, and North and South America.

== Taxonomy ==
The lichen was first described in the scientific literature as Parmelia nilgherrensis by William Nylander in 1874. This taxon was later (1875) transferred by Ferdinand Arnold into Imbricaria (a now obsolete genus name sunk into Anaptychia). However, Nylander's 1874 publication of this species is an illegitimate homonym, as he had previously published this name with a different type in 1869. In 1924, Gustaf Einar Du Rietz described the same taxon as Parmelia arnoldii. Mason Hale transferred it to Parmotrema in 1974, as part of a taxonomic transfer of all species in Parmelia subgenus Parmelia section Irregulare. It is commonly known as the powdered ruffle lichen.

== Description ==
Parmotrema arnoldii has a pale grey thallus comprising lobes that measure 6–15 mmm wide. The thallus lacks maculae (spots or lines free of photobiont). There are soralia present on the upper surface of the tips of the lobes, which causes them to curl downwards. The lobes, especially those lacking soredia, have abundant, long cilia. The lower surface of the thallus (the subthallus) is black to brown and has a naked marginal zone (i.e. without rhizines). Secondary compounds present are atranorin, alectoronic and α-collatolic acids, sometimes accompanied also by skyrin.

=== Similar species ===
Parmotrema margaritatum is identical in appearance, but it has salazinic acid. Cetrelia chicitae is similar in morphology to Parmotrema arnoldii and produces the same secondary substances. However, unlike P. arnoldii, it has pseudocyphellae and thallus margins without cilia.

== Habitat and distribution ==
Parmotrema arnoldii is widely distributed, and has been recorded from temperate locations in Africa, Asia, Europe, Oceania, Macaronesia, and North and South America. Typically growing among mosses that associate with plants, often on old shrubs or horizontal tree branches, the lichen prefers relatively well-lit and humid undisturbed woodlands.

== See also ==
- List of Parmotrema species
