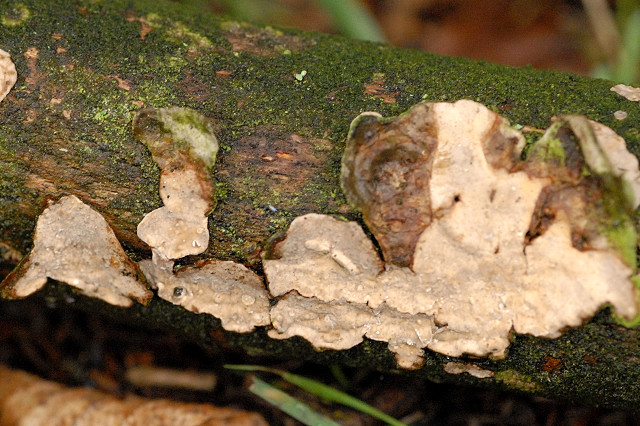

Scientific classification
- Kingdom: Fungi
- Division: Basidiomycota
- Class: Agaricomycetes
- Order: Polyporales
- Family: Phanerochaetaceae
- Genus: Phanerochaete
- Species: P. velutina

Binomial name
- Phanerochaete velutina (DC.) Parmasto (1968)

Synonyms
- Athelia velutina (DC.) Pers. (1822); Corticium velutinum (DC.) Fr. (1838); Grandiniella velutina (DC.) Burds. (1977); Hymenochaete velutina (DC.) Lév. (1846); Hypochnus velutinus (DC.) Wallr. (1833); Kneiffia velutina (DC.) Bres. (1903); Membranicium velutina (DC.) J.Erikss. ex Y.Hayashi (1974); Peniophora scotica Massee (1889); Peniophora velutina (DC.) Cooke (1879); Thelephora velutina DC. (1815)

= Phanerochaete velutina =

Species of fungus

Phanerochaete velutina is a saprotrophic cord-forming fungus that is an agent of wood decay in temperate woodlands.
