= Penicillium kojigenum =

Scientific classification
- Domain: Eukaryota
- Kingdom: Fungi
- Division: Ascomycota
- Class: Eurotiomycetes
- Order: Eurotiales
- Family: Aspergillaceae
- Genus: Penicillium
- Species: P. kojigenum

Binomial name
- Penicillium kojigenum Smith, G. 1961

Type strain
- ATCC 18227, BB394, BCRC 31515, CBS 345.61, CCRC 31515, FRR 3442, IFO 9581, IMI 086562, LSHB BB-394, LSHB BB.394, MUCL 2457, MUCL 39541, NBRC 9581, NRRL 3442, NRRL A-11035, QM 7957

Synonyms
- Penicillium lanosum

Species of fungus

Penicillium kojigenum is an anamorph species of the genus of Penicillium.
