= Coriolopsis floccosa =

Scientific classification
- Kingdom: Fungi
- Division: Basidiomycota
- Class: Agaricomycetes
- Order: Polyporales
- Family: Polyporaceae
- Genus: Coriolopsis
- Species: C. floccosa

Binomial name
- Coriolopsis floccosa (Bull.) Murrill, (1903)

Synonyms
- Cerrena rigida Coriolopsis proteus Coriolopsis rigida Coriolus chudaei Coriolus proteus Fomes palustris Funalia protea Funalia protea var. imbricata Funalia rigida Hexagonia velutinoglabra Inoderma floccosum Microporus ecklonii Microporus floccosus Microporus proteus Microporus rigens Osmoporus carteri Osmoporus floccosus Osmoporus proteus Polyporus captiosus Polyporus excurrens Polyporus flexilis Polyporus floccosus Polyporus livingstoniensis Polyporus nigrocinctus Polyporus proteus Polyporus proteus var. imbricatus Polyporus rusticus Polystictus chudaei Polystictus ecklonii Polystictus floccosus Polystictus rigidus Poria excurrens Trametes acuta Trametes captiosa Trametes carteri Trametes felipponei Trametes floccosa Trametes protea Trametes rigida

Species of fungus

Coriolopsis floccosa is a fungal plant pathogen that produces extracellular laccase, a lignin-modifying enzyme associated with white-rot fungi.
