= Penicillium tardum =

Scientific classification
- Kingdom: Fungi
- Division: Ascomycota
- Class: Eurotiomycetes
- Order: Eurotiales
- Family: Aspergillaceae
- Genus: Penicillium
- Species: P. tardum

Binomial name
- Penicillium tardum Thom, C. 1930

Type strain
- ATCC 10503, CBS 378.48, FRR 1073, IAM 13767, IFO 30549, IFO 30552, IFO 30553, IMI 040034, IMI 040034ii, KCTC 16051, LSHB Ad.45, LSHB AD45, MUCL 39542, NBRC 30549, NBRC 30552, NRRL 1073, QM 6761, Thom 4640.444, Thom 4640.444, Thom, 4640.444, VKM F-2781, VKM F-362

Synonyms
- Penicillium scorteum

Species of fungus

Penicillium tardum is an anamorph species of fungus in the genus Penicillium which produces rugulosin.
