= Leptosphaeria libanotis =

Scientific classification
- Domain: Eukaryota
- Kingdom: Fungi
- Division: Ascomycota
- Class: Dothideomycetes
- Order: Pleosporales
- Family: Leptosphaeriaceae
- Genus: Leptosphaeria
- Species: L. libanotis

Binomial name
- Leptosphaeria libanotis (Fuckel) Niessl (1876)

Synonyms
- Leptosphaeria libanotidis (Fuckel) Niessl; Heptameria libanotis (Fuckel) Cooke (1889); Phoma rostrupii Sacc. (1895); Phoma sanguinolenta Grove; Pleospora libanotis Fuckel (1873)

Species of fungus

Leptosphaeria libanotis is a plant pathogen found mainly in Europe. It is the teleomorph stage of the fungus Phoma rostrupii.
