= Penicillium gladioli =

Scientific classification
- Kingdom: Fungi
- Division: Ascomycota
- Class: Eurotiomycetes
- Order: Eurotiales
- Family: Aspergillaceae
- Genus: Penicillium
- Species: P. gladioli

Binomial name
- Penicillium gladioli McCulloch, L.; Currie, J.N. 1928

Type strain
- ATCC 10448, Biourge 99, CBS 332.42, CBS 332.48, CCM F-326, CGMCC 3.7902, FRR 0939, IAM 13740, IBT 14772, IFO 31733, IMI 034911, IMI 034911ii, JCM 22794, LCP 89.202, MUCL 29174, NBRC 31733, NRRL 93, NRRL 939, QM 1955, Thom 4885, Thom, 4885, VKM F-2088

Species of fungus

Penicillium gladioli is a species of the genus of Penicillium which occurs on corms of the plant Gladiolus debtis. Penicillium gladioli produces gladiolic acid and patulin.
