= Penicillium westlingii =

Scientific classification
- Kingdom: Fungi
- Division: Ascomycota
- Class: Eurotiomycetes
- Order: Eurotiales
- Family: Aspergillaceae
- Genus: Penicillium
- Species: P. westlingii

Binomial name
- Penicillium westlingii Zalessky, K.M. 1927

Type strain
- CBS 231.28, IMI 092272, LSHB P106, Thom 5010.28

Synonyms
- Penicillium intricatum, Penicillium chrzaszczii, Penicillium godlewskii, Penicillium turolense

Species of Penicillium fungus

Penicillium westlingii is a species of fungus in the genus Penicillium which was isolated from soil near Poznań in Poland. Penicillium westlingii produces citrinin and sterol.
