= Puccinia bromina =

Scientific classification
- Domain: Eukaryota
- Kingdom: Fungi
- Division: Basidiomycota
- Class: Pucciniomycetes
- Order: Pucciniales
- Family: Pucciniaceae
- Genus: Puccinia
- Species: P. bromina

Binomial name
- Puccinia bromina Erikss. 1899 (1857)Erikss. 1899

Synonyms
- Pleomeris bromina (Erikss.) Syd., Annls mycol. 19(3-4): 171 (1921); Puccinia symphyti-bromorum Fr. Müll., Beih. Botan. Centralbl., Abt. B 10: 201 (1901); Puccinia bromina subsp. symphyti-bromorum (Fr. Müll.) Z. Urb. & J. Marková, Acta Univ. Carol., Biol. 43(2): 126 (1999); Puccinia persistens var. bromi-erecti J. Marková & Z. Urb., Acta Univ. Carol., Biol. 41(4): 364 (1998

Species of fungus

Puccinia bromina is a fungus species belonging to the order Pucciniales and the family Pucciniaceae. It was originally found on Bromus arvensis in Sweden.

It has been found in Canada on soft brome (Bromus hordeaceus L.) in Vancouver, BC.

== See also ==
- List of Puccinia species
