= Penicillium simplicissimum =

Scientific classification
- Kingdom: Fungi
- Division: Ascomycota
- Class: Eurotiomycetes
- Order: Eurotiales
- Family: Aspergillaceae
- Genus: Penicillium
- Species: P. simplicissimum

Binomial name
- Penicillium simplicissimum Thom, C. 1930

Type strain
- ATCC 10495, CBS 372.48, CBS 391.78B, CCFC007208, DAOM 211759, FRR 0902, IFO 5762, IMI 039816, IMI 039816ii, NBRC 5762, NRRL 902, QM 1939, Thom 5605.2

Synonyms
- Spicaria simplicissima, Penicillium echinulonalgrovense, Penicillium piscarium, Penicillium janthinellum, Penicillium glaucoroseum, Penicillium guttulosum, Penicillium populi, Penicillium pulvillorum, Penicillium glaucolanosum, Penicillium echinulonalgiovense, Penicillium raperi, Penicillium vitale, Penicillium novae-caledoniae var. album, Penicillium ciegleri

Species of fungus

Penicillium simplicissimum is an anamorph species of fungus in the genus Penicillium which can promote plant growth. This species occurs on food and its primary habitat is in decaying vegetations Penicillium simplicissimum produces verruculogene, fumitremorgene B, penicillic acid, viridicatumtoxin, decarestrictine G, decarestrictine L, decarestrictine H, decarestrictine I, decarestrictine K decarestrictine M, dihydrovermistatin, vermistatin and penisimplicissin
