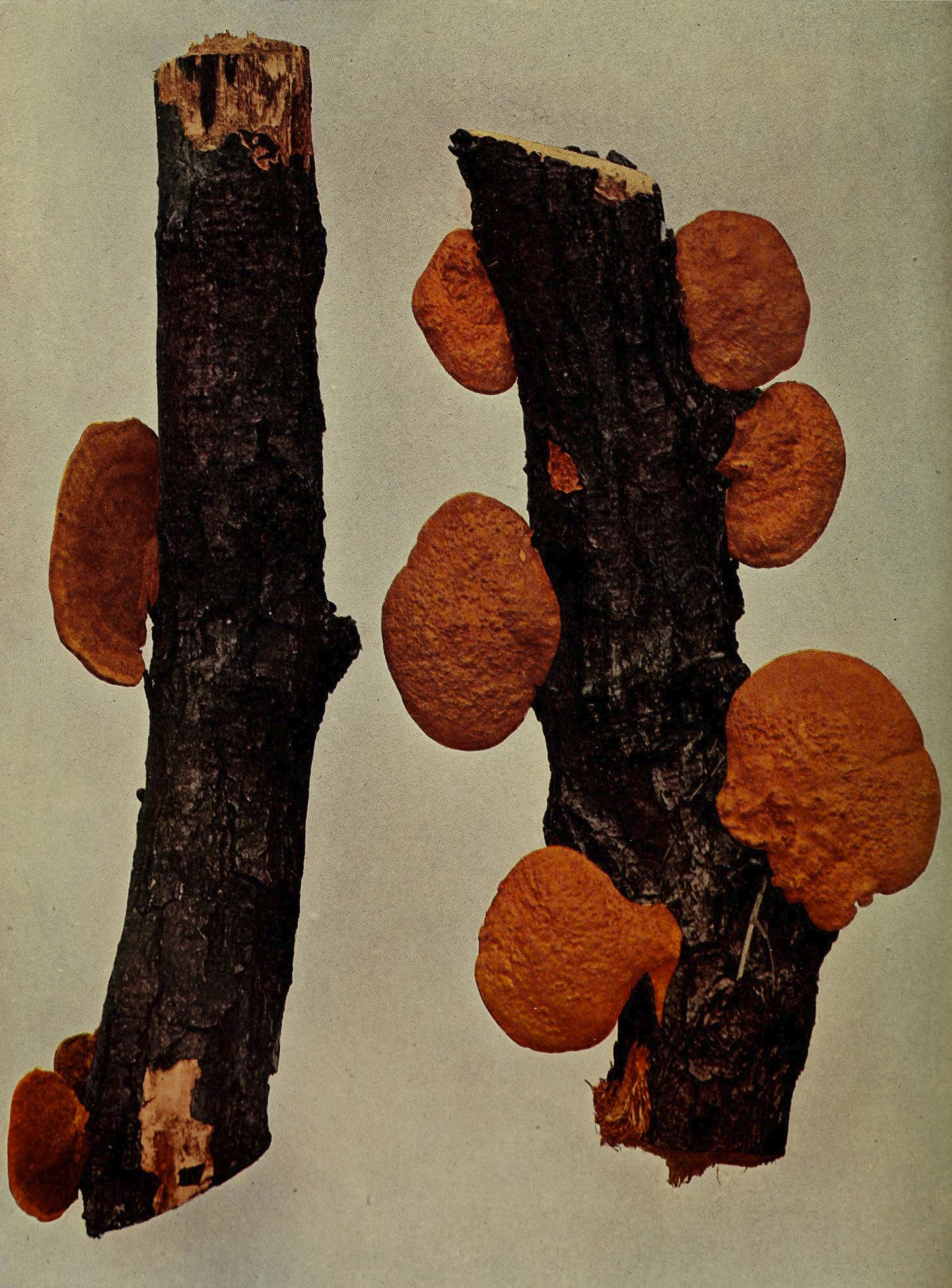

Scientific classification
- Kingdom: Fungi
- Division: Basidiomycota
- Class: Agaricomycetes
- Order: Hymenochaetales
- Family: Hymenochaetaceae
- Genus: Polystictus; Fr. (1851)

= Polystictus (fungus) =

Genus of fungi

Polystictus is a genus of fungi in the family Hymenochaetaceae. These fungi may be a type of wood-decay fungus, like the Polystictus versicolor. Named Chanakpa in Dakota (from Cha, meaning wood or tree, and nakpa, meaning ears), these fungi were used by the Dakota people in the Missouri River region as food. They harvested them when young and tender. They did not harvest from Ash trees, as they claimed this made the fungi taste more bitter. They were prepared by boiling.

Polystictus versicolor is now known as Coriolus versicolor, and has also been called Trametes versicolor and Polyporus versicolor; and colloquially as the turkey-tail fungus.

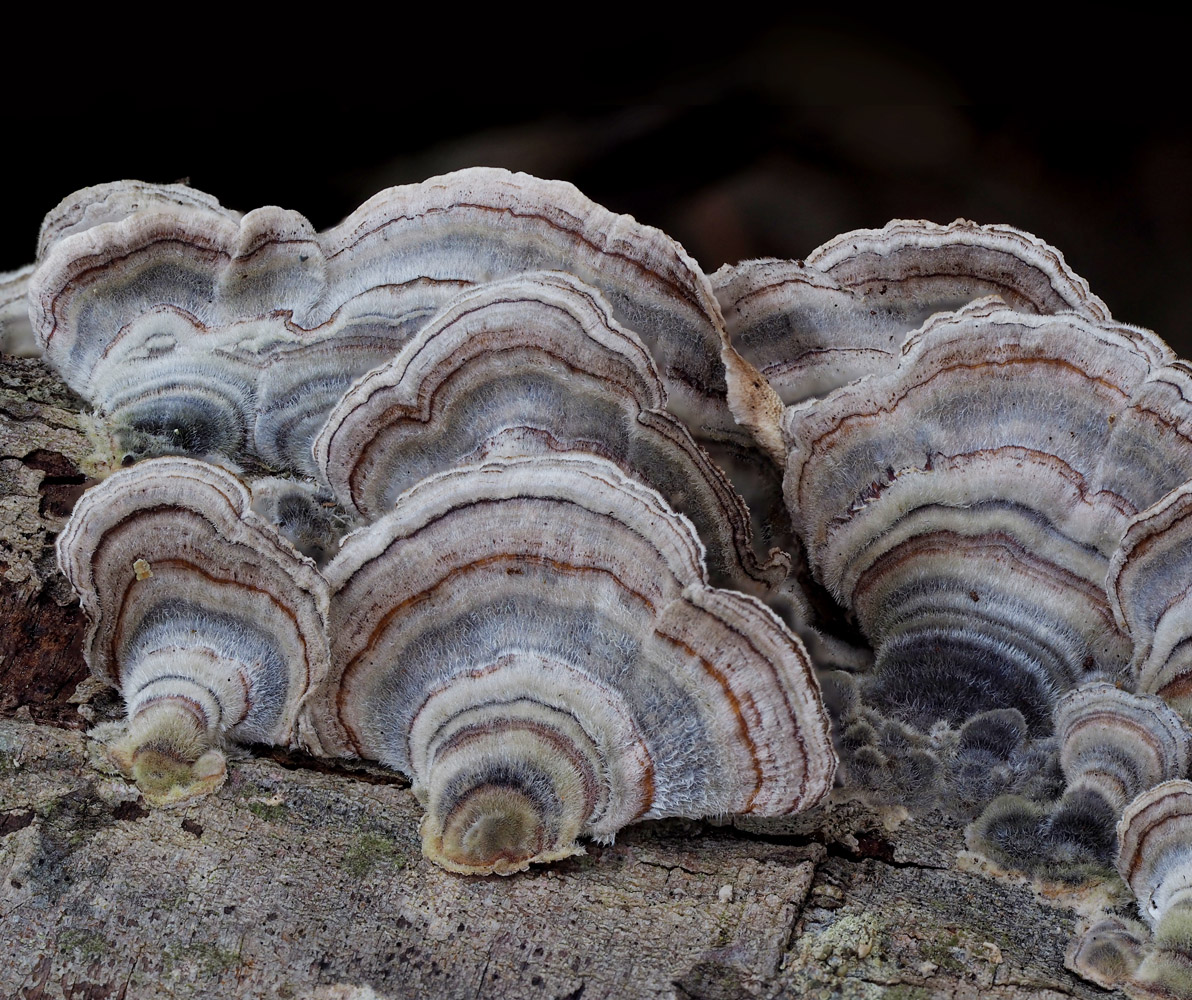
Living turkey-tail fungus
