= Parmotrema abessinicum =

Scientific classification
- Kingdom: Fungi
- Division: Ascomycota
- Class: Lecanoromycetes
- Order: Lecanorales
- Family: Parmeliaceae
- Genus: Parmotrema
- Species: P. abessinicum

Binomial name
- Parmotrema abessinicum (Nyl. ex Kremp.) Hale (1974)

Synonyms
- Parmelia abessinica Nyl. ex Kremp. (1877)

Species of lichen

Parmotrema abessinicum is a species of corticolous lichen in the family Parmeliaceae. It has been recorded from Africa, Asia, and Oceania.

== Taxonomy ==
The lichen was first described scientifically in 1887 by German lichenologist August von Krempelhuber as a species of Parmelia. Mason Hale transferred it to the genus Parmotrema in 1974. The specific epithet abessinica is derived from the Latin abessinicus (meaning "from or belonging to Ethiopia") and refers to the location of its holotype collection. It has also been recorded from Madagascar, Rwanda, India, Sri Lanka, and Fiji.

== Description ==
The thallus is loosely attached to its substratum, and measures 5–7 cm (2.0–2.8 in) across. Its lobes are thick, with a scalloped (crenate) margin, and typically measure 5–10 mm wide. The margins have simple, unbranched cilia up to 3 mm long. Distinguishing morphological characteristics of Parmotrema abessinicum include its ciliate lobe margins, perforate apothecia, and simple rhizines in the thallus centre. It contains the secondary compounds atranorin, norlobaridone, loxodin and protolichesterinic acid. The ascospores of this species are simple and colourless, measuring 15–25 by 8–13 μm.

== See also ==
- List of Parmotrema species
