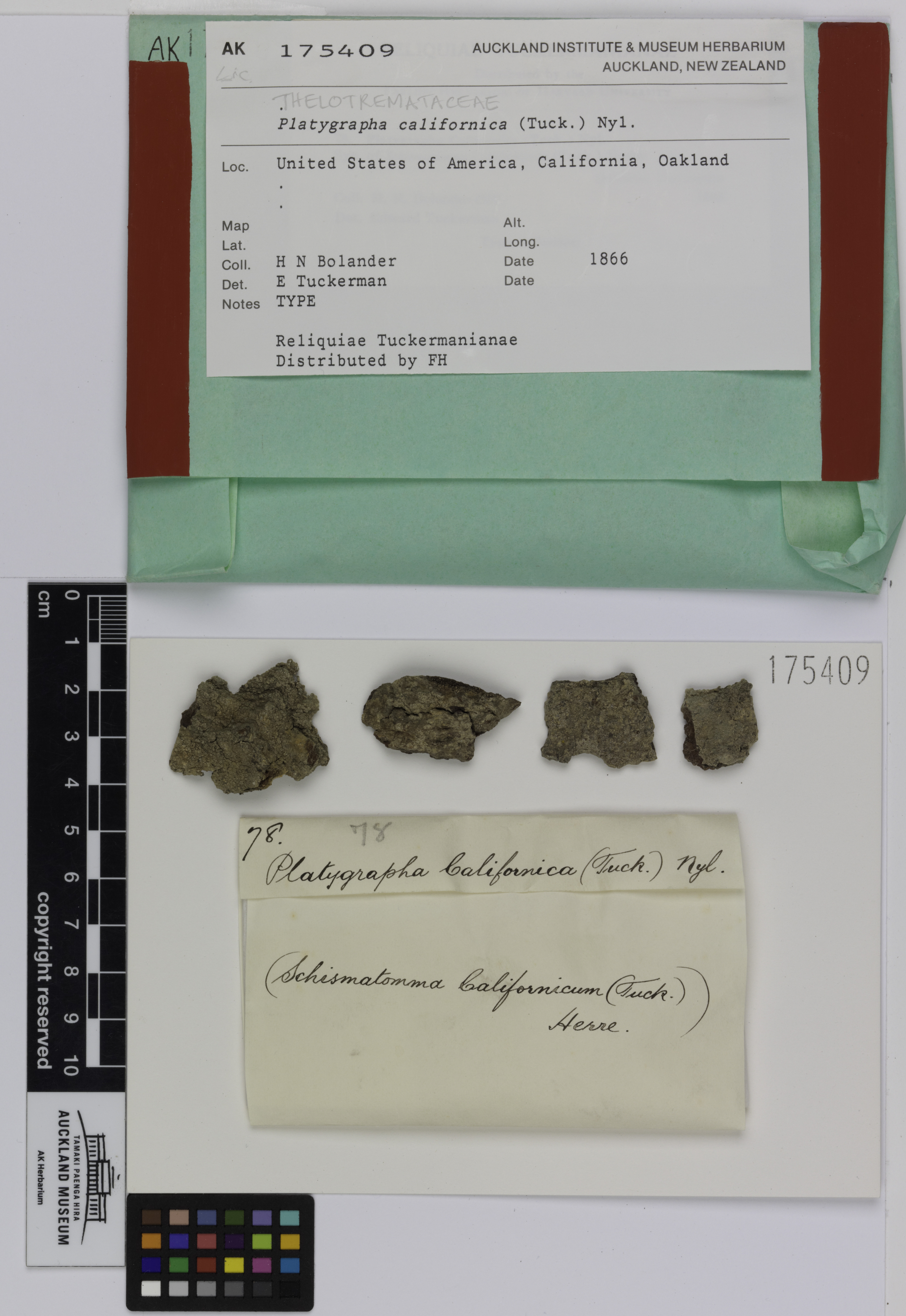
- Platygrapha californica

Scientific classification
- Kingdom: Fungi
- Division: Ascomycota
- Class: Lecanoromycetes
- Order: Graphidales
- Family: Graphidaceae
- Genus: Platygrapha; Berk. & Broome (1870)

Type species
- Platygrapha bivela Berk. & Broome (1875)

= Platygrapha =

Genus of lichen-forming fungi

Platygrapha is a genus of lichen-forming fungi in the family Graphidaceae.
