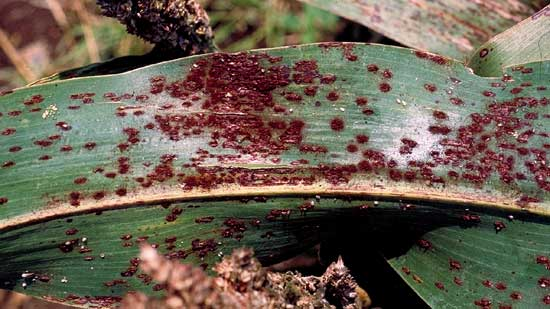

Scientific classification
- Domain: Eukaryota
- Kingdom: Fungi
- Division: Basidiomycota
- Class: Pucciniomycetes
- Order: Pucciniales
- Family: Pucciniaceae
- Genus: Puccinia
- Species: P. purpurea

Binomial name
- Puccinia purpurea Cooke (1876)

Synonyms
- Dicaeoma prunicolor (Syd., P. Syd. & E.J. Butler) Syd., (1922); Dicaeoma purpureum (Cooke) Kuntze, (1898); Puccinia andropogonis-hirti (Maire) Beltrán, (1921); Puccinia prunicolor Syd., P. Syd. & E.J. Butler, (1906); Puccinia sanguinea Dietel, (1897); Puccinia sorghi-halepensis (Pat.) Speg., (1914); Uredo andropogonis-hirti Maire, (1905); Uredo sorghi Fuckel, in Thümen; Uredo sorghi-halepensis Pat.

= Puccinia purpurea =

Species of fungus

Puccinia purpurea is a fungal species and plant pathogen that causes rust on sorghum. It is found in temperate places worldwide, excluding colder parts such as Russia and Canada.

The pathogen was discovered in 1876 by Cooke, on the leaves of Sorghum vulgare in Maharashtra, India.

P. purpurea is also native to eastern Australia, except Queensland. Where, it is considered a pest.

== See also ==
- List of Puccinia species
