= Rigidoporus vinctus =

Scientific classification
- Kingdom: Fungi
- Division: Basidiomycota
- Class: Agaricomycetes
- Order: Polyporales
- Family: Meripilaceae
- Genus: Rigidoporus
- Species: R. vinctus

Binomial name
- Rigidoporus vinctus (Berk.) Ryvarden

Synonyms
- List: Bjerkandera albostygia (Berk. & M.A.Curtis) Murrill; Chaetoporus vinctus (Berk.) J.E.Wright; Fomes acupunctatus (Berk. & Broome) Cooke; Fomes bistratosus (Berk. & Cooke) Cooke; Junghuhnia vincta (Berk.) Hood & M.A.Dick; Physisporinus vinctus (Berk.) Murrill; Polyporus acupunctatus Berk. & Broome; Polyporus albostygius Berk. & M.A.Curtis; Polyporus benetostus Berk.; Polyporus bistratosus Berk. & Cooke; Polyporus hyposclerus Berk.; Polyporus hyposclerus Berk. ex Cooke; Polyporus porphyrophaea Bres.; Polyporus vinctus Berk.; Poria albostygia (Berk. & M.A.Curtis) Lloyd; Poria benetosta (Berk.) Sacc.; Poria carneopallens f. cinerea Bres.; Poria fulvobadia Pat.; Poria fumosa Bres. & Pat.; Poria hyposclera (Berk. ex Cooke) Sacc.; Poria porphyrophaea Bres.; Poria vincta (Berk.) Cooke; Poria vincta subsp. vincta; Poria vincta var. cinerea (Bres.) Setliff; Rigidoporus albostygius (Berk. & M.A.Curtis) Rajchenb.; Rigidoporus vinctus var. cinereus (Bres.) Setliff, 1972; Scindalma acupunctatum (Berk. & Broome) Kuntze; Scindalma bistratosum (Berk. & Cooke) Kuntze; Trametes vincta (Berk.) Pat.

Species of fungus

Rigidoporus vinctus is a plant pathogen infecting bananas.
