= Diaporthe angelicae =

Scientific classification
- Kingdom: Fungi
- Division: Ascomycota
- Class: Sordariomycetes
- Order: Diaporthales
- Family: Diaporthaceae
- Genus: Diaporthe
- Species: D. angelicae

Binomial name
- Diaporthe angelicae (Berk.) D.F. Farr & Castl. (2003)

Synonyms
- Diaporthopsis nigrella (Auersw.) Fabre (1883); Diaporthe nigrella (Auersw.) Niessl (1872); Sphaeria angelicae Berk. (1837)

Species of fungi

Diaporthe angelicae is a fungal plant pathogen. This species is known as the causative agent of carrot umbel rot (Daucus carota), a serious disease affecting seed crops. The association of this species with damage to carrot seed crops was first documented in France between 2007 and 2011.

Genetically, Diaporthe angelicae belongs to the genus Diaporthe, but was previously known as Sphaeria angelicae. Diaporthe angelicae, was transferred to the genus Diaporthe where it was previously located in the genus Diaporthopsis under the taxon Diaporthopsis nigrella.

This pathogen has a fairly wide host range, but it mainly affects plants of the Apiaceae family, including Pastinaca sativa, Petroselinum crispum, Anethum graveolens, and Daucus carota. Wild umbellifers are also susceptible to the pathogen. Infections caused by Diaporthe angelicae have been recorded in several genera, including Angelica, Anthriscus, Daucus, and Eryngium.

== Morphology ==
Cultures of D. angelicae on agar media are initially white, eventually acquiring a brownish-green pigmentation. forms two different spores: Alpha conidia — approximately 6.3 ± 0.5 × 2.3 ± 0.4 µm in size, beta conidia — 23.3 ± 1.8 × 0.9 ± 0.2 µm. also forms perithecia, which produce ascospores.

== Pathogenesis ==
The infection affects the reproductive organs of the plant and is accompanied by the following symptoms: such as the appearance of triangular necrotic lesions on carrot umbels, premature drying of inflorescences, which prevents normal seed development, in other plants — sooty spot and potential impact on photosynthesis accompanied by the suppression of photosynthetic genes, coordinate the expression of key genes.

The Infection usually begins on leaves, forming characteristic necrotic spots, and can then spread to tender stems, causing stem rot, the pathogen spreads widely when there are favorable temperature and humidity conditions, leading to large-scale outbreaks of agricultural diseases.
