= Diaporthe arctii =

Scientific classification
- Kingdom: Fungi
- Division: Ascomycota
- Class: Sordariomycetes
- Order: Diaporthales
- Family: Diaporthaceae
- Genus: Diaporthe
- Species: D. arctii

Binomial name
- Diaporthe arctii (Lasch) Nitschke, (1870)

Synonyms
- Clypeoporthe arctii (Lasch) Tasl., (1992); Diaporthe arctii var. achilleae (Auersw.) Wehm. (1933); Diaporthe discors Sacc., (1880); Diaporthe discrepans Sacc., (1882); Diaporthe inquilina (Wallr.) Nitschke, (1870); Diaporthe labiatae (Cooke) Cooke, (1879); Diaporthe rumicis Plowr. Phoma arctii (Lasch) Sacc., (1881); Phomopsis arctii (Lasch) Traverso, (1906); Sphaeria arctii Lasch, (1846); Sphaeria inquilina Wallr., (1833); Sphaeria labiatae Cooke

Species of fungus

Diaporthe arctii is a fungal plant pathogen.

== Subspecies ==
- Diaporthe arctii var. achilleae
