= Diaporthe dulcamarae =

Scientific classification
- Kingdom: Fungi
- Division: Ascomycota
- Class: Sordariomycetes
- Order: Diaporthales
- Family: Diaporthaceae
- Genus: Diaporthe
- Species: D. dulcamarae

Binomial name
- Diaporthe dulcamarae Nitschke

Synonyms
- Diaporthe sarothamni var. dulcamarae (Nitschke) Wehm., (1933); Phoma dulcamarae (Nitschke) Sacc., (1881); Phomopsis dulcamarae (Sacc.) Traverso, (1906); Phyllosticta dulcamarae Sacc., (1878)

Species of fungus

Diaporthe dulcamarae is a fungal plant pathogen of the genus Diaporthe.
