= Diaporthe phaseolorum var. phaseolorum =

Scientific classification
- Kingdom: Fungi
- Division: Ascomycota
- Class: Sordariomycetes
- Order: Diaporthales
- Family: Diaporthaceae
- Genus: Diaporthe
- Species: D. phaseolorum (Cooke & Ellis) Sacc. (1882)
- Variety: D. p. var. phaseolorum

Trinomial name
- Diaporthe phaseolorum var. phaseolorum

Synonyms
- Diaporthe phaseolorum (Cooke & Ellis) Sacc., (1882); Phoma phaseoli Desm., (1836); Phoma subcircinata Ellis & Everh., (1893); Phomopsis phaseoli (Desm.) Sacc., (1915); Phomopsis phaseoli var. phaseoli (Desm.) Sacc. Septomazzantia phaseolorum (Cooke & Ellis) Lar.N. Vassiljeva, (1998); Sphaeria phaseolorum Cooke & Ellis, (1878)

Fungal plant pathogen

Diaporthe phaseolorum var. phaseolorum is a plant pathogen infecting soybean, sweet potato and peanut.

== See also ==
- List of soybean diseases
- List of sweet potato diseases
- List of peanut diseases
