= Diaporthe helianthi =

Scientific classification
- Kingdom: Fungi
- Division: Ascomycota
- Class: Sordariomycetes
- Order: Diaporthales
- Family: Diaporthaceae
- Genus: Diaporthe
- Species: D. helianthi

Binomial name
- Diaporthe helianthi Munt.-Cvetk., Mihaljč. & M. Petrov, (1981)

Synonyms
- Phomopsis helianthi Munt.-Cvetk., Mihaljč. & M. Petrov, (1981)

Species of fungus

Diaporthe helianthi is a fungal pathogen that causes Phomopsis stem canker of sunflowers. In sunflowers, Phomopsis helianthi (teleomorph =Diaporthe helianthi) is the causative agent behind stem canker. Its primary symptom is the production of large canker lesions on the stems of sunflower plants. These lesions can eventually lead to lodging and plant death. This disease has been shown to be particularly devastating in southern and eastern regions of Europe, although it can also be found in the United States and Australia. While cultural control practices are the primary method of controlling for Stem Canker, there have been a few resistant cultivars developed in regions of Europe where the disease is most severe.

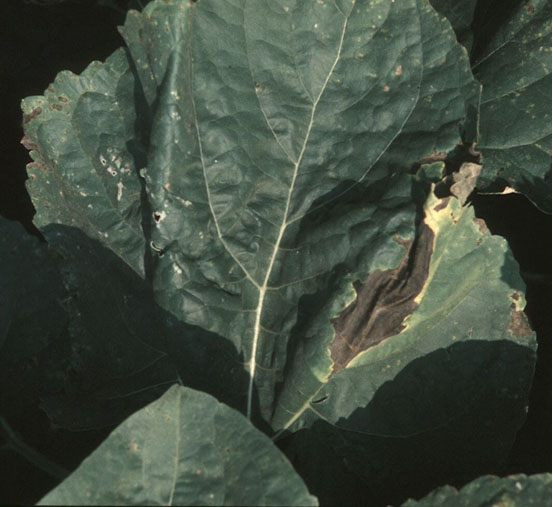
Leaf lesion proceeding along major leaf vein (Photo: Dr Tom Gulya, USDA)

== Host and symptoms ==
Stem canker on sunflower is caused by the fungal pathogen Phomopsis helianthi (teleomorph = Diaporthe helianthi). There are many "Phomopsis" species that have a broad host range, but "Phomopsis helianthi" is the primary pathogen that infects sunflower, although it has also been seen to infect other, secondary hosts. Some "Phomopsis" species have been found to be able to cause disease on several host genera. Sunflower hosts that found in high densities are particularly susceptible to attack by the pathogen due to the microclimate formed in crowded areas. This microclimate has a high humidity and allows for infection to proceed rapidly. There has also been recent molecular evidence to suggest there are several genetically distinct species of Phomopsis that can cause disease on the sunflower hosts.

Initial symptoms of P. helianthi infection can be found at the attachment of petiole to the stem on the lower portion of the plant. Initial infection will cause brown necrotic regions with a chlorotic border. Eventually these regions will grow into larger, brown to tan lesions and eventually into large cankers. Cankers are found on the stem and will have a sunken border. Cankers can be long, up to 6 inches, but do not appear until flowering. Other early symptoms can include necrosis and bronzing of intervenial areas of leaves at or above the stem lesion. Wilting and death of leaves above the canker also occurs. Leaves above the site of inoculation can also show symptoms of being water soaked. This is sometimes accompanied by leave distortion. Phomopsis stem canker is also characterized by extensive pith degradation to the point where the stalk is easily crushed under moderate thumb pressure. Wilting is also a typical symptom, and extensive wilting can eventually lead to lodging later in the season. Phomopsis also produces mycotoxins, which can cause additional symptoms such as premature ripening or early plant death.

Disease identification is facilitated by observation of fruiting structures. Perithecia are found on cortical tissues and will produce globular to sub-cylindrical asci with two-celled ascospores. It has been observed that isolates from stem canker in the United States will readily form perithecia when grown in culture, but those from Europe will not. This suggests that there may be several species or biotypes of Phomopsis that cause stem canker worldwide. Pycnidia, the asexual fruiting bodies, can be detected on the stem and leaf lesions throughout the disease cycle. They are embedded in the tissue, dark brown and globular. The conidia come in two types, but the most common is beta conidia that are threadlike, hyaline and can be curled or straight.

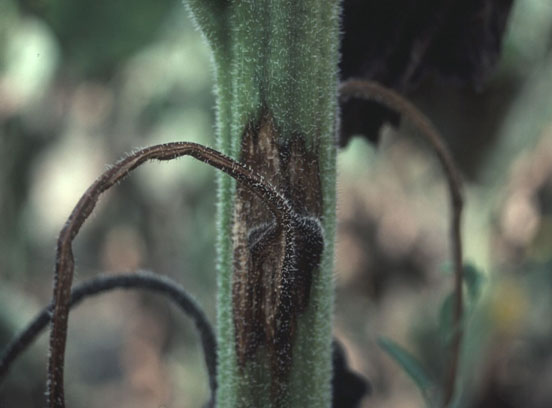
Petiole infection leading to stem infection (Dr. Tom Gulya USDA)

== Disease cycle ==
Stem canker on sunflower has both a teleomorphic and anamorphic stage. The anamorphic stage is given the name Phomopsis helianthi. When the teleomorphic stage was discovered, it was given the name Diaporthe helianthi. Infection is initiated onto the leaves by windblown or rain splashed ascospores that were released from overwintering perithecia, the telomorphic fruiting body. The infection begins at lower leaves and spreads through the intercellular spaces and terminal veins throughout the vascular system. The leaves that contain the original inoculum will quickly wilt and die but by then the infection has already entered the stem where it persists. Pycnidia, the anamorphic fruiting body, will form in the infected tissue and release two types of conidia – alpha and beta. Alpha conidia are oval to fusoid in shape while beta conidia are threadlike. Both conidia are produced, but the proportion of alpha to beta may change depending on environmental conditions. Beta conidia are most frequently produced. At the end of the season, perithecia formed on leaves and other diseased tissues will remain in the debris and survive for the next season. The perithecia can survive in debris for up to five years and Phomopsis has also been shown to be dispersed through seed.

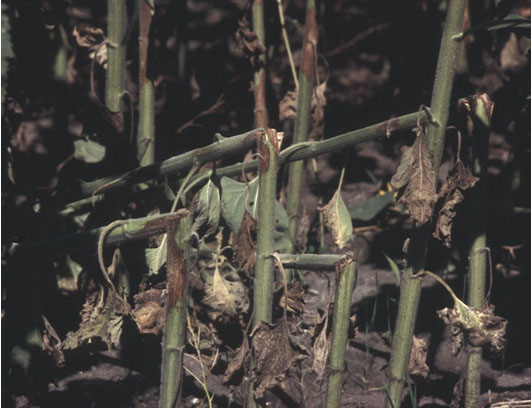
Lodging due to stem infections. (Photo: Dr Tom Gulya, USDA)

== Environment ==
This disease is most severe in southern and eastern Europe but several cases have been reported from Argentina as well as USA. The overwintering structures (perithecia) allows this fungus to survive in unfavorable conditions. Ascopsores from these perithecia are released during the growing season and are spread by wind and rain splash throughout the season. Relative humidity of 90% and temperatures ranging from 20-24°C favors the disease development. Abundant rainfall during the budding to flowering stage promotes the infection more than the temperature.

== Management ==
The fungus produces overwintering structures which makes it difficult to manage. Proper treatment (burning or burying deep under the ground) of the plant waste in fall and crop rotation can decrease disease incidence and severity. Some Phomopsis resistance hybrids are available in Europe where the disease is particularly severe. There are no commercial hybrids available in US which are resistant. There are several methods that can be employed to control this disease, some of which are discussed below:

=== Genetic control ===
In early 1980s all the commercial hybrids available were completely susceptible. Only a couple of varieties like ‘Yubileynaya 60’ and ‘Progress’ were somewhat tolerant with only 5% of plants without disease. It was found out that resistance to this pathogen is polygenic rather than controlled by single dominant gene. After several years of study and research, there were some hybrid varieties developed in Europe that were indeed resistant to Phomopsis. Studies have shown that the genetic mechanisms of resistance correspond to a few genes with additive effects.

=== Chemical control ===
Fungicides were also used to control this disease. Although fungicides must be applied before symptoms appear, typically during flowering stage. Treatments after appearance of symptoms were proven to be ineffective. Application of fungicide reduced the severity of the disease and increased the yield but was unable to reduce the number of infected plants significantly. To this date there are no registered fungicides in U.S. for control of this disease.

=== Cultural control ===
Cultural control serves a key role in the control of this disease. Controlling crop densities, Nitrogen fertilization and crop rotation may help decrease the incidence of this disease. In 2010, Debaeke and Moinard showed that the early Phomopsis attacks were related to changes in microclimate resulting from crop management practice or cultivar architecture. The later attacks were more dependent on surface area of leaf available and air movement in the canopy provided the inoculum is present and microclimate is favorable to germination of spores. It was found that the pathogen was not found if the infected stems were incorporated >5cm below ground.

There are currently no biological control strategies developed for this disease.

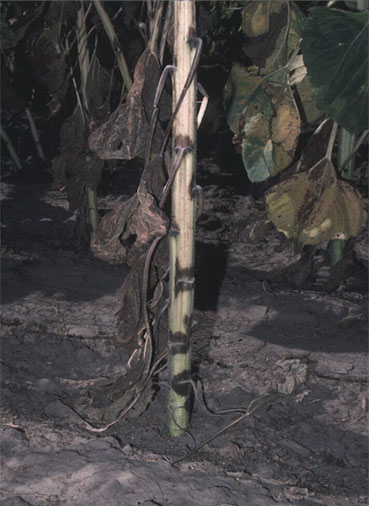
Multiple stem infection causing plant death (Photo Dr Tom Gulya, USDA)

== Importance ==
Phomopsis stem canker of sunflower is a serious disease caused by Phomopsis helianthi (sexual stage = Diaporthe helianthi), it was first observed in Europe in the late 1970s followed by U.S. in 1980s. Some of the earliest reports of this disease came from certain areas of Ohio State. After careful studies and examinations, they were able to detect pycnidia of Phomopsis spp. Emergence of this new disease became more and more apparent with increased number of reports from all over the world including Rumania in 1985, Hungary in 1983, France in 1985, and Iran in 1988. Relatively recently, Stem cankers were observed on sunflower plants growing in a field in Illinois. This is also becoming an emerging problem in Australian sunflower plants with yield losses reaching up to 40%. Since the fungus is highly specific to sunflower, it will be difficult to find it in areas without major sunflower production. Disease is most severe in high temperatures and high rainfall leading to significantly high yield losses. NSA crop surveys show significant yield losses in Minnesota (22% infected plants in 2007)as well as North Dakota with an incidence of over 40% plants infected. Yield losses usually go higher with lodging
