= Diaporthe litchicola =

Scientific classification
- Kingdom: Fungi
- Division: Ascomycota
- Class: Sordariomycetes
- Order: Diaporthales
- Family: Diaporthaceae
- Genus: Diaporthe
- Species: D. litchicola

Binomial name
- Diaporthe litchicola Tan, Edwards, Grice & Shivas

Species of fungus

Diaporthe litchicola is a plant endophyte and occasionally a plant pathogen, first found on Litchi chinensis in Australia.
