= Diaporthe beilharziae =

Scientific classification
- Kingdom: Fungi
- Division: Ascomycota
- Class: Sordariomycetes
- Order: Diaporthales
- Family: Diaporthaceae
- Genus: Diaporthe
- Species: D. beilharziae

Binomial name
- Diaporthe beilharziae Tan, Edwards, Grice & Shivas

Species of fungus

Diaporthe beilharziae is a plant endophyte and occasionally a plant pathogen, first found on Indigofera australis in Australia.
