= Diaporthe tanakae =

Scientific classification
- Kingdom: Fungi
- Division: Ascomycota
- Class: Sordariomycetes
- Order: Diaporthales
- Family: Diaporthaceae
- Genus: Diaporthe
- Species: D. tanakae

Binomial name
- Diaporthe tanakae Ts. Kobay. & Sakuma, (1982)

Synonyms
- Phomopsis tanakae Ts. Kobay. & Sakuma 1982

Species of fungus

Diaporthe tanakae is a fungal plant pathogen.
