= Diaporthopsis =

Scientific classification
- Kingdom: Fungi
- Division: Ascomycota
- Class: Sordariomycetes
- Order: Diaporthales
- Family: Diaporthaceae
- Genus: Diaporthopsis; Fabre

Genus of fungi

Diaporthopsis is a genus of fungi belonging to the family Diaporthaceae.

The species of this genus are found in Europe and Northern America.

Species:

- Diaporthopsis acus Anon.
- Diaporthopsis apiculosa (Ellis) Wehm.
- Diaporthopsis nigrella (Auersw.) Fabre (This species was transferred to the genus Diaporthe, under the taxon Diaporthe angelicae)
- Diaporthopsis pantherina (Berk.) Wehm.
- Diaporthopsis sclerophila Bonar
- Diaporthopsis spiraeae E.Müll. & S.Ahmad
- Diaporthopsis urticae (Fr.) Arx & E.Müll.
