= Diaporthe rudis =

Scientific classification
- Kingdom: Fungi
- Division: Ascomycota
- Class: Sordariomycetes
- Order: Diaporthales
- Family: Diaporthaceae
- Genus: Diaporthe
- Species: D. rudis

Binomial name
- Diaporthe rudis (Fr.) Nitschke, (1870)

Synonyms
- Aglaospora rudis (Fr.) Tul. & C. Tul., (1863); Aplosporella rudis (Fr.) Petr. & Syd., (1923); Diaporthe faginea (Curr.) Sacc., (1882); Diaporthe medusaea Nitschke, (1870); Rabenhorstia rudis (Fr.) Fr., (1849); Sphaeria faginea Curr. Sphaeria rudis Fr., (1828); Valsa faginea Curr., (1858)

Species of fungus

Diaporthe rudis is a fungal plant pathogen.
