= Diaporthe phaseolorum var. caulivora =

Scientific classification
- Kingdom: Fungi
- Division: Ascomycota
- Class: Sordariomycetes
- Order: Diaporthales
- Family: Diaporthaceae
- Genus: Diaporthe
- Species: D. phaseolorum
- Variety: D. p. var. caulivora

Trinomial name
- Diaporthe phaseolorum var. caulivora Athow & Caldwell

Synonyms
- Diaporthe phaseolorum f.sp. caulivora Phomopsis phaseoli f.sp. caulivora

Fungal plant pathogen

Diaporthe phaseolorum var. caulivora is a fungal plant pathogen which infects soybean, causing soybean stem canker.

== Host and symptoms ==
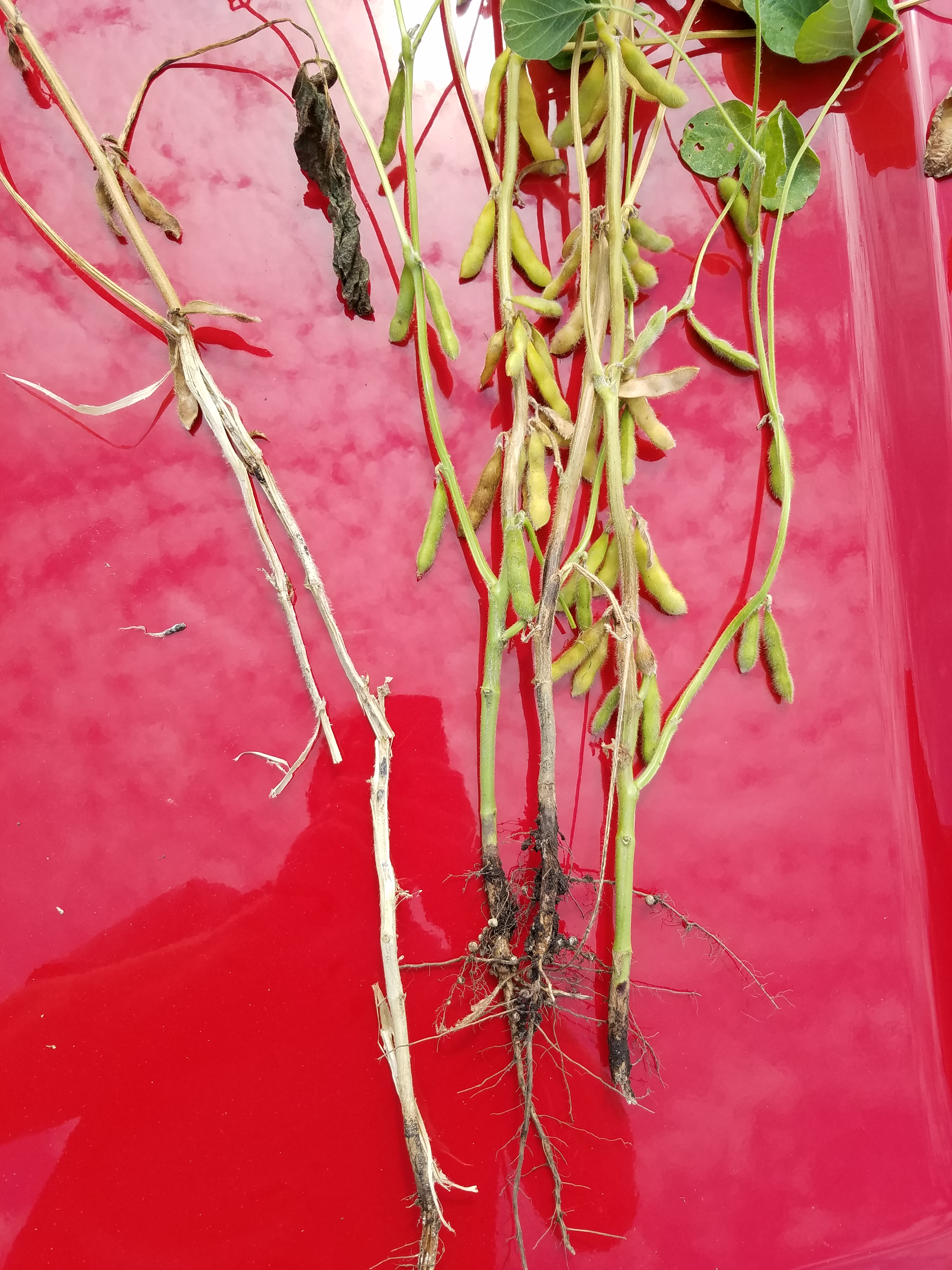
_{White mold symptomology (left) vs. Stem canker symptomology (right)}

Soybean (Glycine max) is the most economically important host of soybean stem canker caused by Diaporthe phaseolorum var. caulivora. Since the early 1940s, Stem Canker was a prevalent disease in the upper Midwest. Soybean host plant susceptibility has been researched since the early 1950s, bringing light to the need for developing resistant varieties. Botanist AA Hildebrand ran a varietal selection experiment to determine susceptible varieties in northern climates. Successful removal of susceptible cultivars “Hawkeye” and “Blackhawk” greatly reduced the impact of this disease. In the past 30 years, successful breeding for resistant varieties has greatly reduced the significance of this disease in certain parts of the country, however sporadic incidences of the disease still occur. In soybean, the main factor affecting disease susceptibility is the presence or absence of resistance genes in specific cultivars.

Along with soybean, many common weed species have been studied as potential hosts. Investigations have identified 13 weed species for soybean stem canker when inoculated directly with ascospores. Inoculation success to these weeds species was found in greenhouse experiments though outdoor trials were not as successful. More recently, many weed species, such as black nightshade, curly dock, and morning glory, have been confirmed as susceptible hosts, yet few show symptomology of the disease until plant death. Weed species as host for this disease are of particular interest because of their potential to act as an inoculum for the disease on soybean.

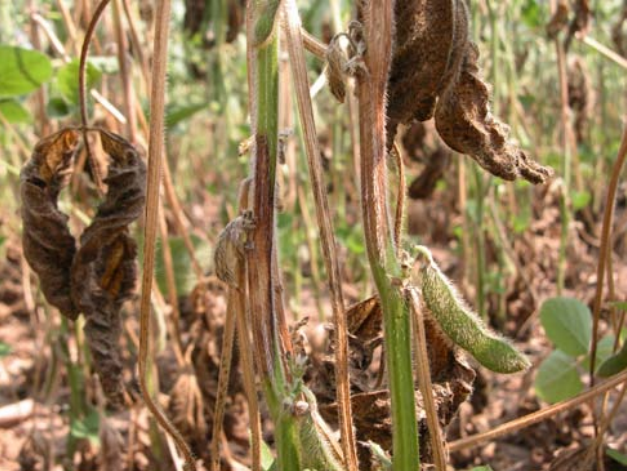
_{Soybean stem canker stem browning}

Disease symptoms occur primarily on the stems, leaves and can lead to whole plant symptoms. Reddish brown lesions on the lower stem of soybean plants progress into brown cankers. In some cases, the disease can spread to all parts of the stem. Stem girdling can result in premature plant death. Grey streaking along the lower stem and taproot has also been observed. Studies suggest a toxin may influence the development and symptomology of stem canker. Leaf symptoms include interveinal chlorosis and necrosis during early reproductive stages. Leaves eventually dry and fall off the plant as the disease worsens. Stem canker has similar symptomology as brown stem rot, fusarium wilt, phytopthora stem rot, sudden death syndrome, tobacco streak virus, and sclerotinia stem rot, which can make distinguishing this disease particularly difficult. Stem canker can be differentiated primarily by its long dark red or brown canker that can extend over multiple nodes. Inside the stem, discoloration is localized to areas near the canker or lesion.

== Environment ==
Environmental conditions during the vegetative growth stage are most important for stem canker development. When plants are infected at V3 growth stage they are subject to the highest severity of disease of any growth stage. The combination of early growth stage susceptibility to disease and optimal environmental conditions can cause a stem canker epidemic if not treated properly. Fields subjected to hail damage have been shown to have increased stem canker severity.

The optimal air temperature for infection occurs at 83.5 °F, while infection readily occurs when temperatures are between 82 °F and 93 °F. Along with optimal temperature, moisture is needed for infection. During vegetative growth stages, rainfall is crucial to the development of stem canker infections. Cumulative rainfall is positively related to higher disease severity. Further, if dry conditions follow wet conditions during vegetative growth stages, plant mortality increases. This is because the disease inhibits the flow of water through the stem to plant extremities, therefore dry periods after infection stress plants more than wet periods after infection.

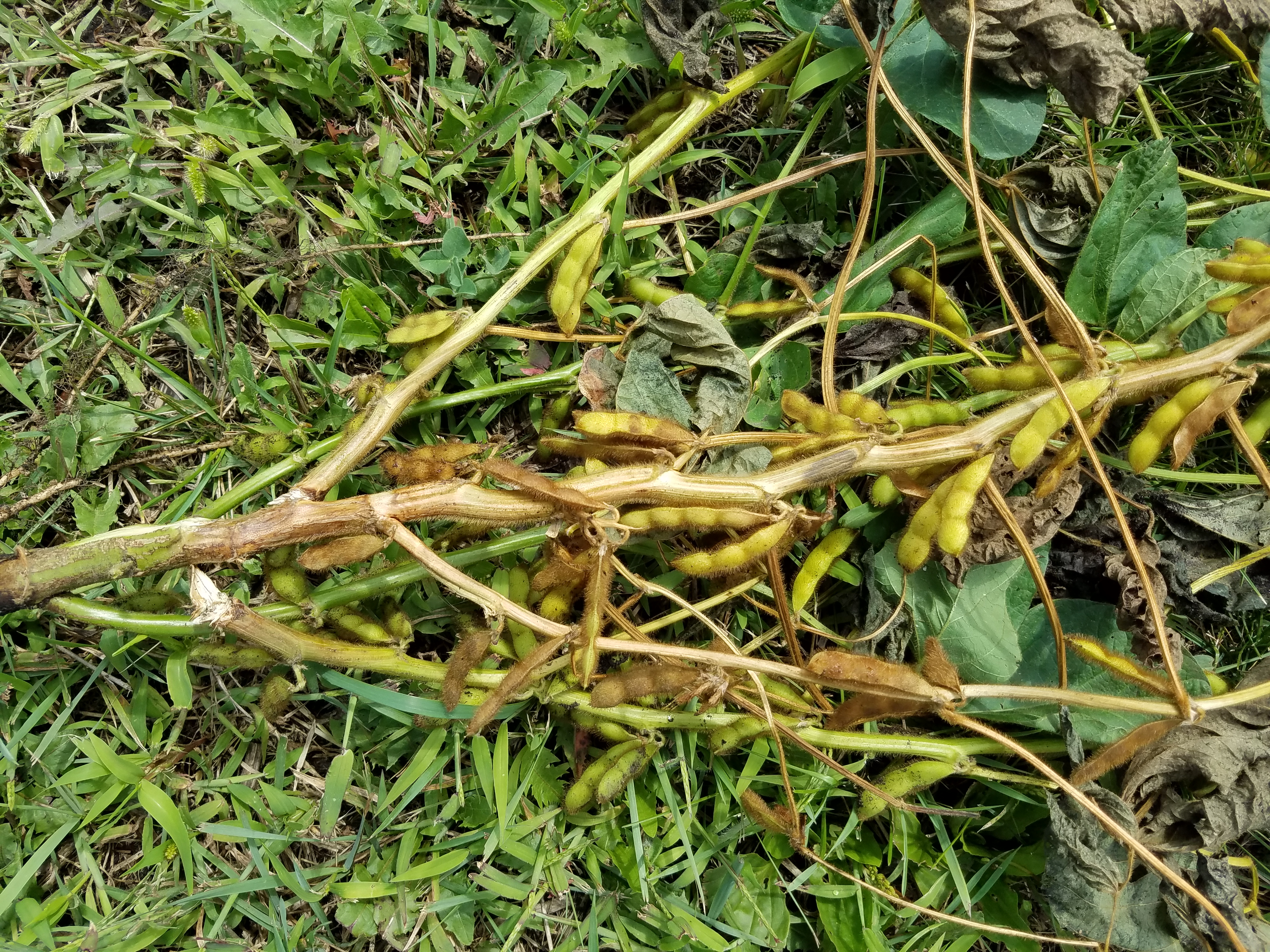
_{red/brown symptomology of soybean infected with stem canker}

== Management ==
Management of soybean stem canker is greatly influenced by proper cultivar selection. Selecting resistant soybean varieties is currently the best management practice for this disease, followed by crop rotation to a non-host crop. Furthermore, soybean grown for seed should not be planted if harvested from a field with a history of stem canker. In-furrow fungicides applied at planting can reduce infestation to seed during germination, but will not control the disease completely. Rotations in to corn, wheat or sorghum for at least 2 years is recommend after a severe infestation.

Fungicide sprays for this disease may not be effective on susceptible cultivars, however will manage an outbreak in moderately susceptible cultivars. Fungicides, such as benzimidazoles, should be sprayed during the early vegetative growth stages to avoid an outbreak. Minimum or no till fields have a higher susceptibility to stem canker because of the increased amount of crop residue that increases the survival rate of the disease. Incorporation of residue or tillage will reduce disease development in the field. Lastly, high organic matter and/or high fertility levels can positively influence stem canker infestation. To manage this, use best management practices to maintain sufficient soil fertility levels.

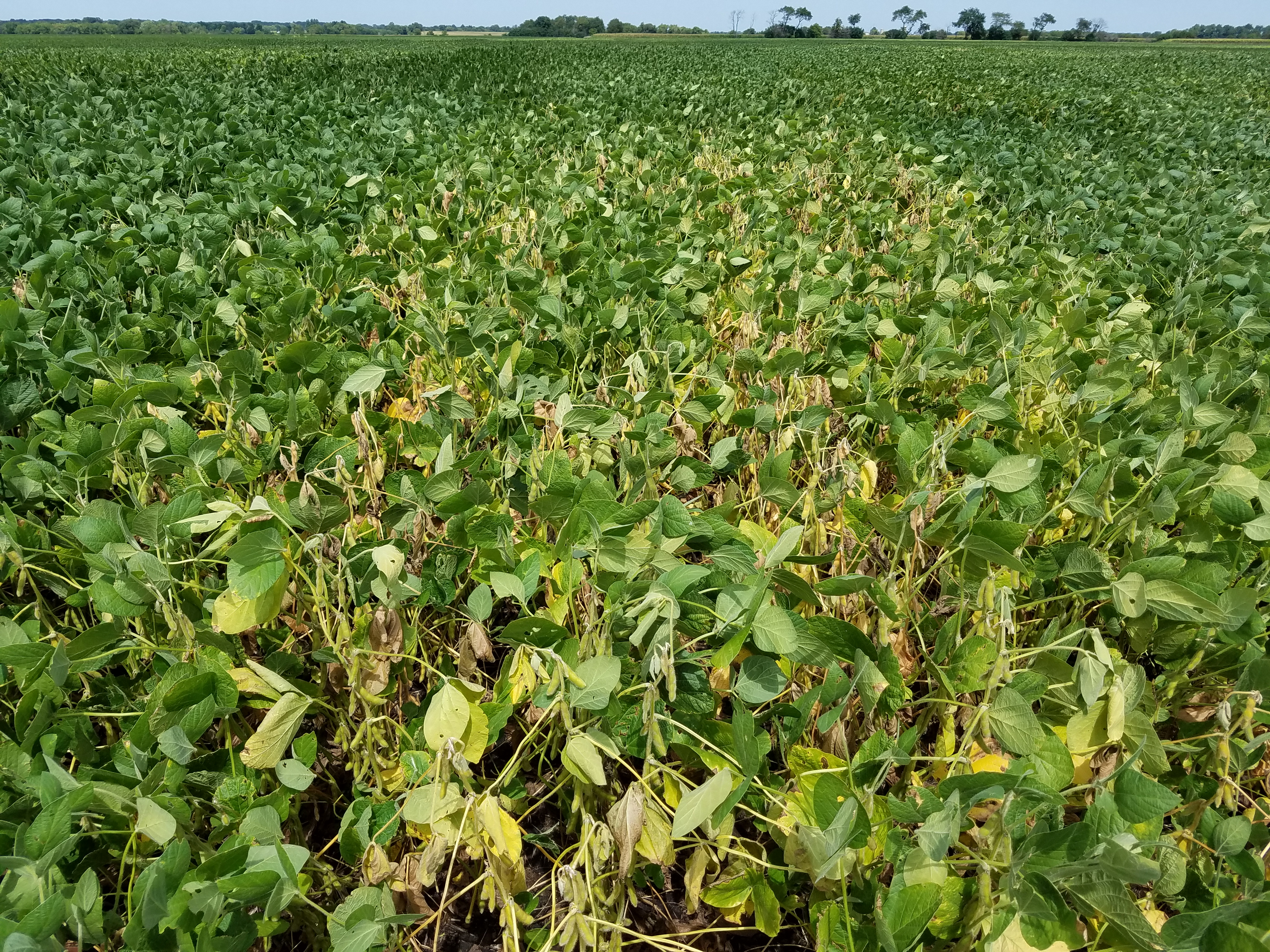
_{Field view of stem canker symptomology}

== See also ==
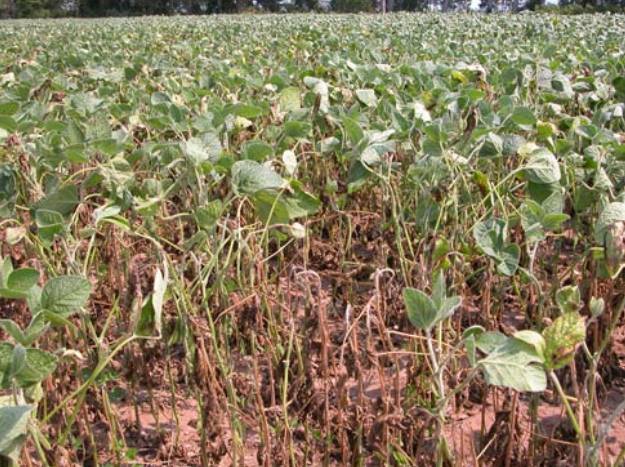
- _{field view of soybean stem canker symptomology}
  List of soybean diseases
