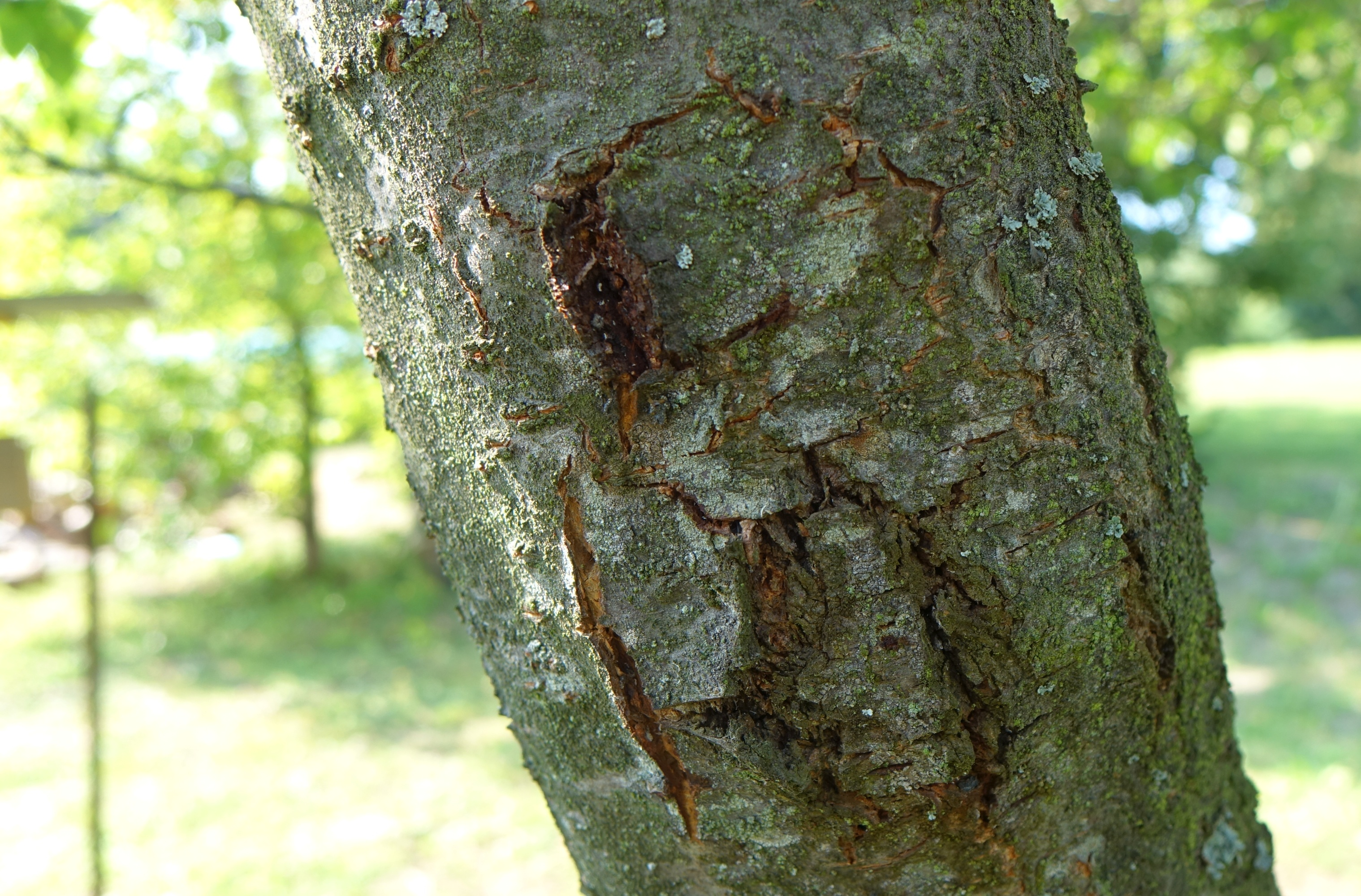
- bark canker on a plum tree caused by D. perniciosa

Scientific classification
- Kingdom: Fungi
- Division: Ascomycota
- Class: Sordariomycetes
- Order: Diaporthales
- Family: Diaporthaceae
- Genus: Diaporthe
- Species: D. perniciosa

Binomial name
- Diaporthe perniciosa Marchal & É.J.Marchal (1921)

= Diaporthe perniciosa =

Species of fungus

Diaporthe perniciosa a species of fungus in the family Diaporthaceae. It is a plant pathogen.

The names Phoma prunorum Cooke, Phomopsis prunorum (Cooke) Grove, and Phomopsis mali Roberts have been used for its asexual (anamorph) form.

It causes bark cankers on trees in the genera Malus (apples), Pyrus (pears) and Prunus (plums, cherries, peaches and other similar fruits). It has also been implicated in dieback disease of plums. One study in the late 1980s was able to isolate the fungus from several trees with die-back symptoms but inoculation of healthy trees with the fungus did not result in disease.
