= Diaporthe melonis =

Scientific classification
- Kingdom: Fungi
- Division: Ascomycota
- Class: Sordariomycetes
- Order: Diaporthales
- Family: Diaporthaceae
- Genus: Diaporthe
- Species: D. melonis

Binomial name
- Diaporthe melonis Beraha & M.J. O'Brien, (1979)

Synonyms
- Phomopsis cucurbitae McKeen, (1957)

Species of fungus

Diaporthe melonis is a fungal plant pathogen.
