= Diaporthe orthoceras =

Scientific classification
- Kingdom: Fungi
- Division: Ascomycota
- Class: Sordariomycetes
- Order: Diaporthales
- Family: Diaporthaceae
- Genus: Diaporthe
- Species: D. orthoceras

Binomial name
- Diaporthe orthoceras (Fr.) Nitschke, (1870)

Synonyms
- Phoma achilleae Sacc., (1882); Phomopsis achilleae (Sacc.) Höhn., (1906); Phomopsis achilleae (Sacc.) Traverso, (1906); Septomazzantia orthoceras (Fr.) Lar.N. Vassiljeva, (1993); Sphaeria orthoceras Fr., (1828)

Species of fungus

Diaporthe orthoceras is a fungal plant pathogen.
