= Diaporthe salicicola =

Scientific classification
- Kingdom: Fungi
- Division: Ascomycota
- Class: Sordariomycetes
- Order: Diaporthales
- Family: Diaporthaceae
- Genus: Diaporthe
- Species: D. salicicola

Binomial name
- Diaporthe salicicola Tan, Edwards, Grice & Shivas

Species of fungus

Diaporthe salicicola is a plant endophyte and occasionally a plant pathogen, first found on Salix purpurea in Australia.
