= Diaporthe nothofagi =

Scientific classification
- Kingdom: Fungi
- Division: Ascomycota
- Class: Sordariomycetes
- Order: Diaporthales
- Family: Diaporthaceae
- Genus: Diaporthe
- Species: D. nothofagi

Binomial name
- Diaporthe nothofagi Tan, Edwards, Grice & Shivas

Species of fungus

Diaporthe nothofagi is a plant endophyte and occasionally a plant pathogen, first found on Nothofagus cunninghamii in Australia.
