= Diaporthe lokoyae =

Scientific classification
- Kingdom: Fungi
- Division: Ascomycota
- Class: Sordariomycetes
- Order: Diaporthales
- Family: Diaporthaceae
- Genus: Diaporthe
- Species: D. lokoyae

Binomial name
- Diaporthe lokoyae A. Funk, (1968)

Species of fungus

Diaporthe lokoyae is a fungal plant pathogen.
