= Diaporthe fraxini-angustifoliae =

Scientific classification
- Kingdom: Fungi
- Division: Ascomycota
- Class: Sordariomycetes
- Order: Diaporthales
- Family: Diaporthaceae
- Genus: Diaporthe
- Species: D. fraxini-angustifoliae

Binomial name
- Diaporthe fraxini-angustifoliae Tan, Edwards, Grice & Shivas

Species of fungus

Diaporthe fraxini-angustifoliae is a plant endophyte and occasionally a plant pathogen, first found on Fraxinus angustifolia subsp. oxycarpa in Australia.
