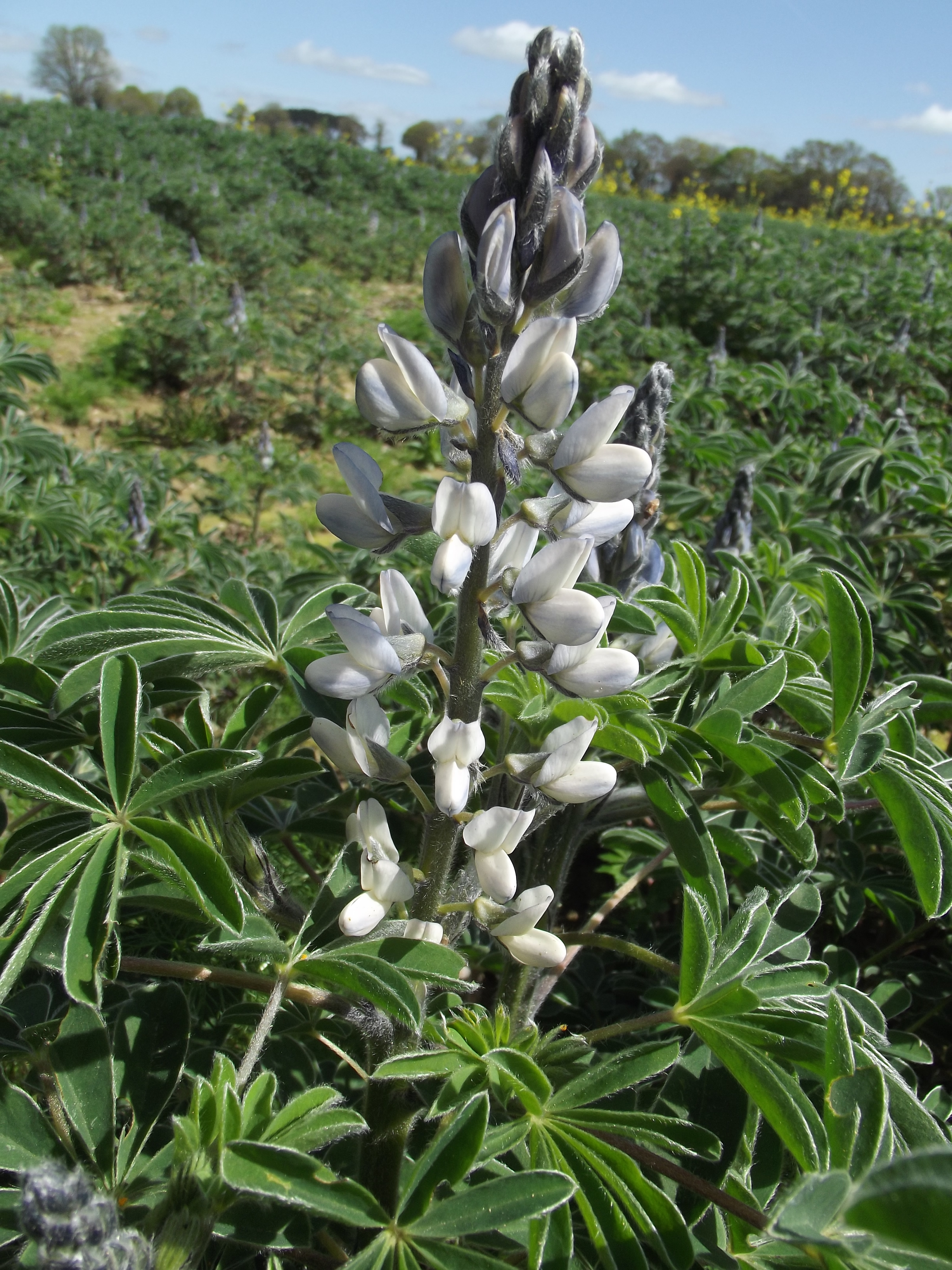

Scientific classification
- Kingdom: Plantae
- Clade: Tracheophytes
- Clade: Angiosperms
- Clade: Eudicots
- Clade: Rosids
- Order: Fabales
- Family: Fabaceae
- Subfamily: Faboideae
- Genus: Lupinus
- Species: L. albus

Binomial name
- Lupinus albus L.

= Lupinus albus =

Species of edible plant

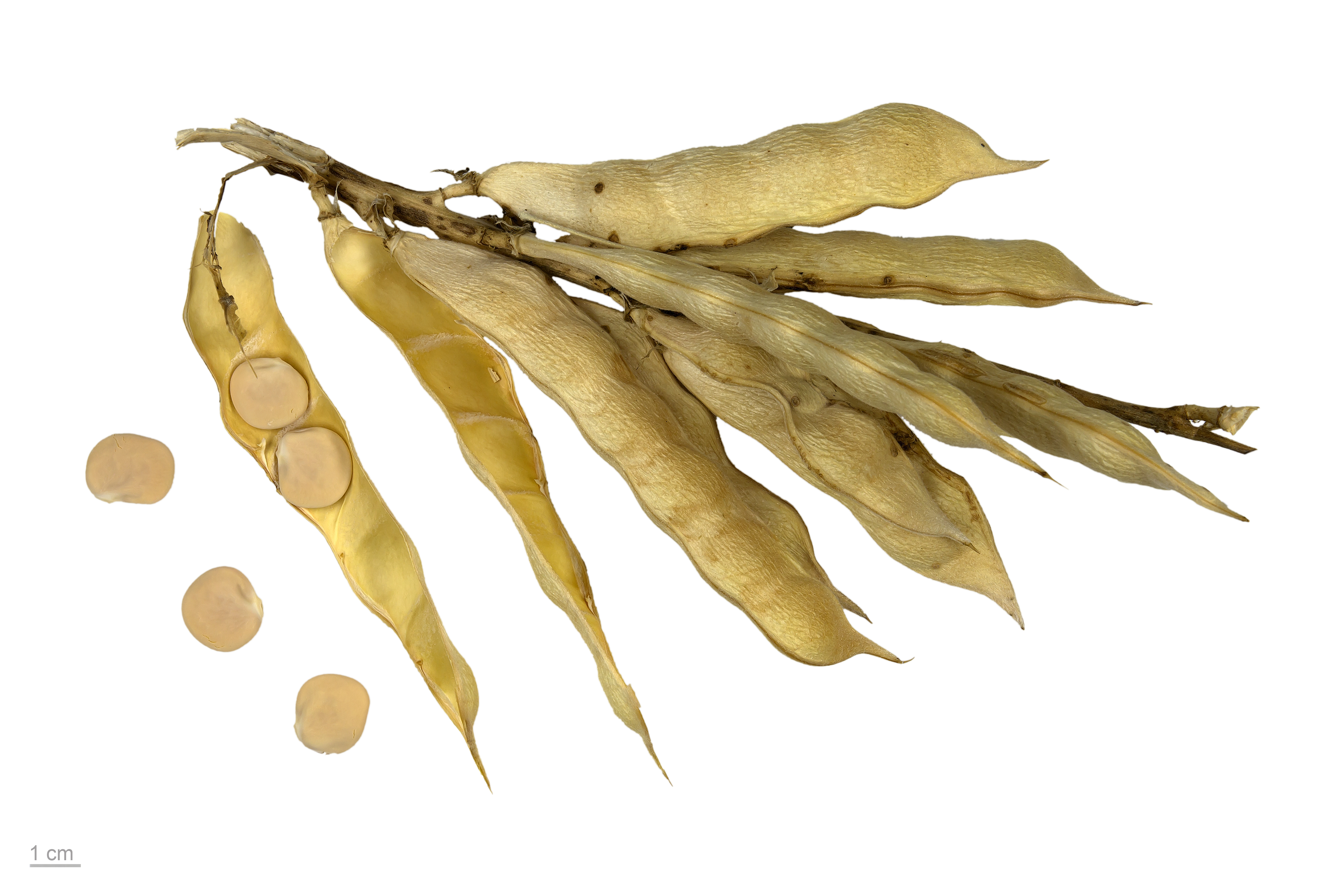
Lupinus albus

Lupinus albus, commonly known as the white lupin, is a species of the genus Lupinus in the family Fabaceae native to the northeastern Mediterranean region. It is also a traditional pulse cultivated across the Mediterranean region and elsewhere.

== Description ==
The white lupin is an annual, more or less pubescent plant that typically reaches 30 to 120 cm in height. It grows naturally throughout the Balkans, the island of Sicily, and Turkey, and is also widely naturalised across the Mediterranean region including North Africa, in Europe north to Great Britain, Germany, the Baltic States and western Russia, and also in the Indian subcontinent. Naturalised populations are also known in Australia and Chile. It is found in meadows, pastures, and grassy slopes on both sandy and acidic soil. The white lupin is cultivated throughout the Mediterranean region and in Egypt, Sudan, Ethiopia, Syria, Europe, South America, and tropical and southern Africa. The ancient cultivation of white lupin under the local name hanchcoly was practiced until recently in western Georgia. It is also sometimes known in cultivation as "field lupin", though this name is imprecise, having been applied to several species in the genus.

White lupin is distinct within the large and polymorphous genus Lupinus for a small variation of morphological characteristics. However, the species has wide, intraspecific variability in physiological plant properties; the duration of vernalisation time and growth rate, photoperiodic sensitivity, shape tolerance, drought resistance, and cold- and winter-hardiness. There are winter and spring forms of white lupin. The duration of the growing period under spring sowing varies from 106 to 180 days, seed mass per plant varies from 2.2 g to 40 g, green mass yield per from 9 g to 250 g, protein content in the seed from 35.0% to 53.7%, and oil content from 6.2% to 12.0%.

== Classification ==
- subsp. graecus (Boiss. et Spun.) Franko et Silva
- subsp. termis (Forsk.) Ponert.
  - var. abissinicus Libk.
  - var. subroseus Libk.
  - subsp. albus L.
- var. albus
- var. vavilovii (Atab.) Kurl. et Stankev.
- var. vulgaris Libk.
  - f. libkindae Kurl. et Stankev.

== History and modern uses ==
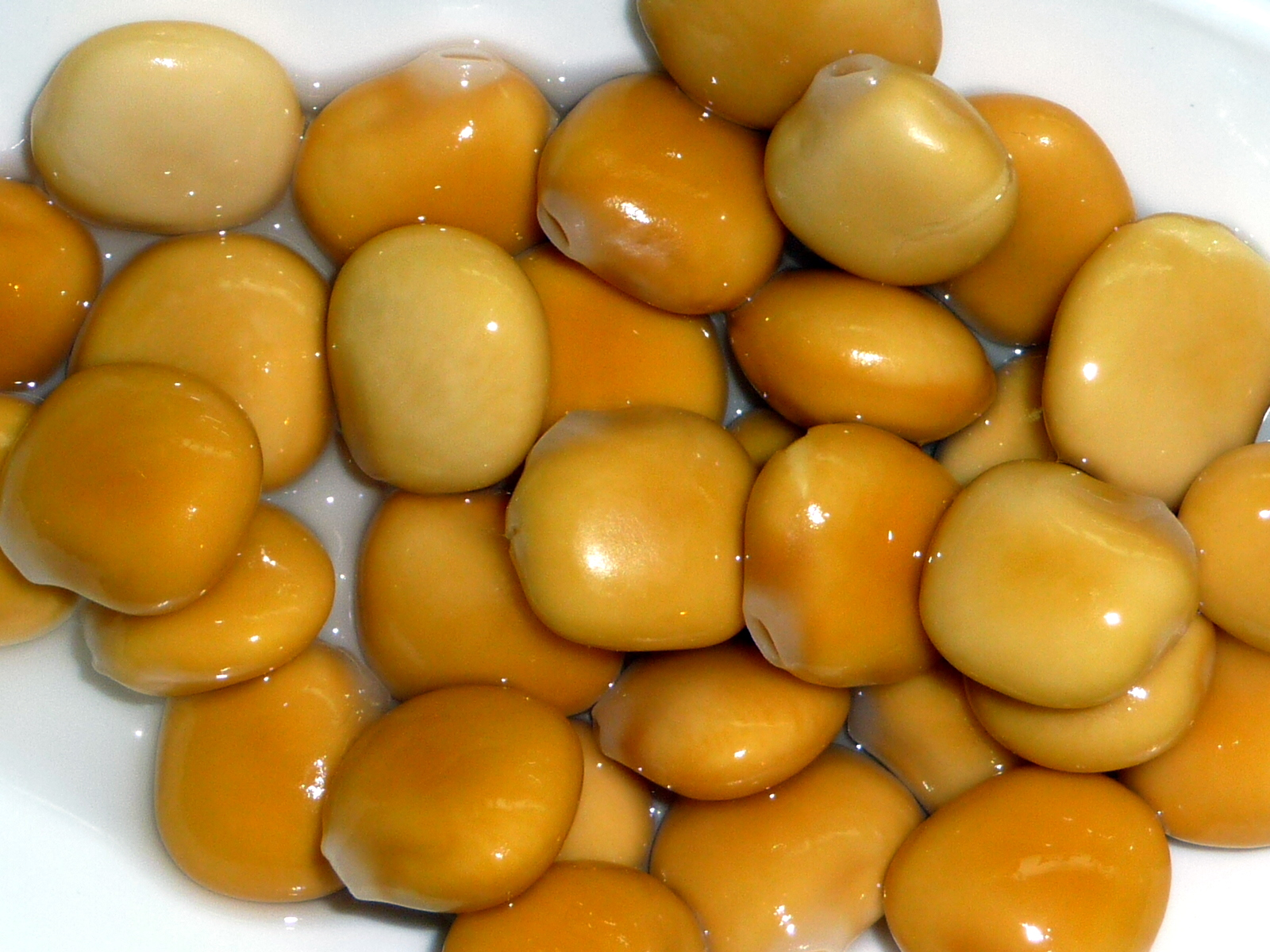
Lupinus albus beans, cooked and preserved in brine.

The beginning of lupin cultivation in the Old World is sometimes associated with Ancient Egypt. It is more likely, however, that white lupin was originally introduced into cultivation in ancient Greece, where its greatest biodiversity was concentrated and where wild-growing forms have been preserved until today (ssp. graecus). On the Balkan Peninsula, representatives of another subspecies of white lupin (ssp. termis and ssp. albus) turned wild and now grow in natural environments. Also, the Grecian genesis of cultivated lupin may be testified by lupin's Greek name thermos, which translates roughly to "hot". White lupin dispersed from Greece to adjacent regions and states over time, particularly Egypt and Ancient Rome. The forms of lupin with white seeds and pink-and-blue or light-pink flowers (L. termis) spread mainly towards the south (Egypt, Libya, and Palestine), while the forms with white seeds and grayish-blue or white flowers (L. albus) moved to the west (Apennine Peninsula and beyond).

According to Zohary and Hopf, "even today the white lupin is an appreciated food crop and it is still cultivated in some Mediterranean countries—particularly Egypt." In Greece, especially on the island of Crete and in the Peloponnese area, lupin seeds are a very common snack during Lent. They are normally soaked in seawater for 2–3 hours to mellow the flavour and are then consumed raw. In France, Spain, Portugal, central and southern Italy, and parts of Brazil, lupin is a very popular snack (tramousse or lupin in French, lupini in Italian, tremoços in Portuguese, altramuces or chochos in Spanish, tramussos in Catalan). Lupin is known in Arabic as ترمس termes, and the seeds are sold as a popular street snack in Egypt after being soaked and brined.

== Cultivation ==
Since ancient times, white lupin has been widespread in the Mediterranean region and in the Middle East due to its high tolerance for acidic soils and its soil-restoration abilities. It tolerates a soil acidity up to pH = 6.5, while alkaline or organic soils are not suitable for growth. The soil must be well drained and loose because lupin is subject to root asphyxia. White lupin flourishes in the same climate zones as maize, although lupin, except at the beginning of the growing season, requires little water thanks to its long tap root.

=== Sowing ===
In hotter climate zones, such as in Italy, sowing occurs following plowing in October–November in order to bury the stubble of the previous crop (often a cereal.) Due to its branched structure, lupin can adapt to different sowing densities, compensating for a lower density with a higher branch growth. In colder zones where lupin cannot survive the winter, white lupin is sowed in the spring, typically between March and April. The soil must be prepared as soon as possible after the last frost of the winter. The seedbed must be sufficiently fine, particularly in organic farming where mechanical weeding is done (so that harrowing the displacement of clods does not harm the plants). In regions where lupin is not indigenous, if it is cultivated for the first time in a soil or if the soil pH is higher than 6.5, lupin seeds must be inoculated with the nitrogen-fixing bacterium Rhizobium lupini. Soil acidity is an important factor for nitrogen fixation.

=== Fertilisation ===
Due to its symbiosis with nitrogen-fixing bacteria, white lupin does not need nitrogen fertilisation, though it requires about 40 kg/ha of P_{2}O_{5} and 60 kg/ha of K_{2}O. Due to its long tap root, white lupin can exploit phosphorus reserves in the soil. The crop rotation for white lupin ideally lasts at least four or five years, and lupin is often grown after a cereal crop. Lupin is a good preculture since it leaves about 50 kg/ha of nitrogen in the field.

=== Weed control ===
Lupin does not compete well with weeds, particularly in the colder zones, because it only produces sufficient foliage to shade out weeds in late summer. Mechanical weeding is feasible, as is hoeing if the rows are wide enough. Chemical weeding is also used, by means of herbicides applied for other grain legumes.

=== Yield ===
Depending on the climate zone of cultivation, pods ripen sometime between late June and late August. Seeds do not ripen all at once and are harvested when 90% of the pods are brown. To harvest with a combine harvester the ideal seed water content is 13-16%. Good yields are between 2 t/ha and 3.5 t/ha, although average yields are lower.

== Diseases ==
As there are numerous diseases affecting Lupinus albus, management is complex and important. Higher yields can be obtained by sowing early in the year, but this strategy can increase the impact of pests and diseases.

Fungal diseases are often controlled with fungicides. To control non-fungal diseases, the most effective practices are crop rotation and the use of disease-free seeds.

=== Fungi ===
The following three fungi are lupin-specific and fully adapted to the presence of alkaloids:

- Pleichaeta setosa, which causes brown-leaf spot and can be combatted by selecting frost–tolerant plants
- Uromyces lupinicolus, also known as rust, which causes defoliation and biomass reduction, and be treated with triazole fungicides
- Colletotrichum gloeosporioides, a seed-borne disease which can kill lupin plants before they flower, resulting in a null yield, and which is mostly addressed via seed treatment

=== Viruses ===
Bean mosaic virus is transmitted by aphids and infected seeds, and is the major viral disease for Lupinus albus. A major disease for other lupins is cucumber mosaic virus, but Lupinus albus is immune to it.

=== Pests ===
Phorbia platura is the only insect which has historically significantly impacted Lupinus albus. Insect larvae may damage the roots and hypocotyls, and can be treated most effectively via soil insecticides or other seed treatments.

Aphids are also a problem, particularly during the budding and early pod stages. They reduce crop yield, limit the number of flower blooms, and also lead to pod formation. They can also transmit diseases.

Other pests and detrimental organisms include:

- bean seedling maggots, which cause seedlings to wilt and die
- beetle and moth larvae, which kill seedlings
- slugs, which attack leaves
- thrips, which attack flowers and leaves
- mired bugs, which attack young seed pods
- budworms, which feed on pods and seeds

== Nutritional aspects ==
Nutrient content per 100 g portion
	Lupin (mature seeds)	Soybean (mature seeds)	Wheat flour (whole grain)
Energy (kcal)	371	446	332
Protein (g)	36.17	36.49	9.61
Total lipid (fat) (g)	9.74	19.94	1.95
Carbohydrate (g)	40.37	30.16	74.48
Fibre (g)	18.9	9.3	13.1

The chemical composition of lupin seeds depends on the cultivation region except for the protein content which is independent from environmental conditions. White lupin seeds contain a high amount of protein. The net protein utilisation is slightly lower than that of animal protein. The fats have a 2:1 ratio of omega-6 (w-6) to omega-3 (w-3), whereby oleic acid (w-9) accounts for about 50% of the fat. The carbohydrates found in the seeds are mainly soluble and insoluble fibre and the starch content is very low. Therefore, lupin seeds have a low glycaemic index. The main macroelements found in white lupin seeds are K, Mn, and Mg, and the prevailing microelements are Ca, Fe, and Na.

The white lupin seeds have a low or very low content of antinutrients. Their removal is possible through food processing treatments (e.g., dehulling, germinating, cooking, soaking, fermentation, and extraction). Total alkaloid content in sweet white lupin cultivars does not currently exceed 0.02%. Some of the sulphur-containing amino acids (about 4% of the proteins) may have an allergenic effect. The main allergens are Lup-1 (a conglutin b, vicilin-like protein), and Lup-2 (conglutin a, legumin-like protein).

== Animal nutrition ==
=== Ruminants ===
Although an excessive use of L. albus or other lupin species can cause unwanted side-effects, this species may prove useful as a feeding supplement for livestock. While L. albus is used in Australia to provide sheep with protein in the form of a whole-grain feed supplement, there are concerns regarding product quality and safety. This is due to the susceptibility of some lupin cultivars towards Diaporthe toxica. This fungus can cause a fatal intoxication with lupin seed called lupinosis, which appears to mainly affect sheep.

While there no major negative health effects have been found in cattle, it has been found that supplementation with L. albus can cause a decrease in milk protein concentration and milk protein yield in dairy cows. Nonetheless, roasted seeds of L. albus appear to be a good source of rumen protected fatty acids.

=== Non-ruminants ===
Unlike its use with ruminants, L. albus should not be considered as an optimal feed for pigs. Research indicates that a diet based on white lupin results in poorer growth rates due to reduced feed intake when compared with other lupin species, such as L. angustifolius. Experiments have indicated that ingesting L. albus can affect digestibility and nutrient uptake in piglets negatively.

Although broilers can tolerate a high share of lupin seeds in their diet, excess use should be avoided, as it causes moist faeces that negatively affects hygiene and promotes health risks. It has been shown that L. albus has the potential to partly replace the use of soybean in poultry production.

White lupin seeds have also been recommended as rabbit feed, and may prove useful as a partial replacement for fish meal or soybean meal in aquaculture.

== See also ==
- Lupin bean and Lupinus for species and genus information, and for other uses of the lupin bean.

== General references ==
- Gladstones, J. S. 1974. Lupinus of the Mediterranean region and Africa. Bull. West. Austr. Depart. of Agr. 1974. N 26. 48 p.
- Gladstones, J. S. 1998. Distribution, Origin, Taxonomy, History and Importance. In: J.S. Gladstones et al. (eds.), Lupin as Crop Plants. Biology, Production and Utilization, 1-39.
