= D. lagunensis =

D. lagunensis may refer to:

- Diaporthe lagunensis, a plant pathogen
- Dyscolus lagunensis, a ground beetle
