= Clypeoporthella =

Scientific classification
- Kingdom: Fungi
- Division: Ascomycota
- Class: Sordariomycetes
- Order: Diaporthales
- Family: Diaporthaceae
- Genus: Clypeoporthella; Petr. (1924)

Type species
- Clypeoporthella brencklei Petr. (1924)

Species
- C. appendiculata C. brencklei C. kriegeriana

Genus of fungi

Clypeoporthella is a genus of fungi in the family Diaporthaceae.
