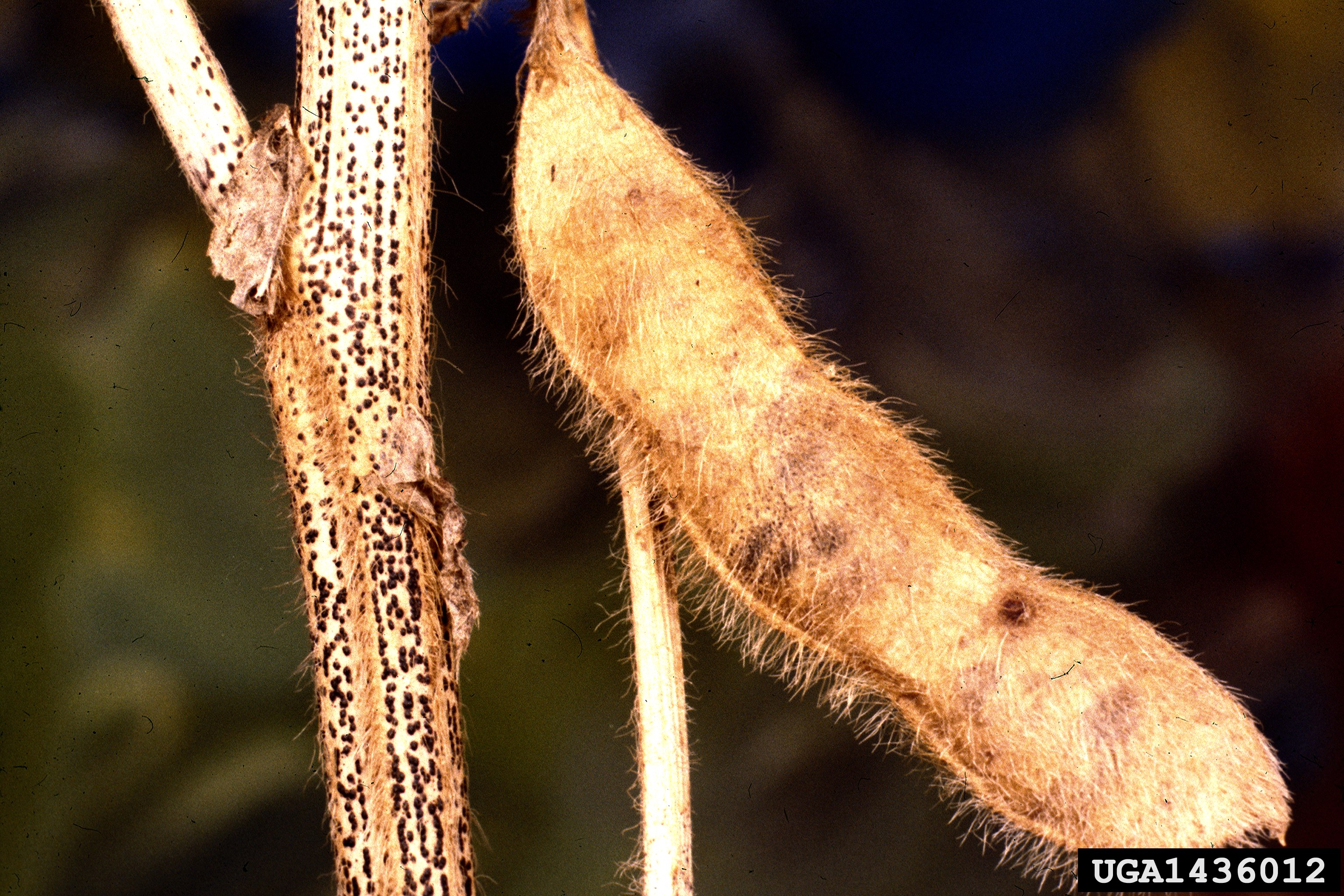
- Diaporthe damage on soybean plant

Scientific classification
- Domain: Eukaryota
- Kingdom: Fungi
- Division: Ascomycota
- Class: Sordariomycetes
- Order: Diaporthales
- Family: Diaporthaceae
- Genus: Diaporthe; Nitschke (1870)

Type species
- Diaporthe eres Nitschke (1870)

Species
- See text

= Diaporthe =

Genus of fungi

Diaporthe is a genus of endophytic filamentous fungal plant pathogens.

Diaporthe species have been shown to transform the infection-inhibiting factors (+)-catechin and (−)-epicatechin into the 3,4-cis-dihydroxyflavan derivatives.

Some species, like Diaporthe toxica, produce secondary metabolites that result in toxicoses of animals such as lupinosis of sheep.

== Selected species ==
- Diaporthe arctii
- Diaporthe citri
- Diaporthe dulcamarae
- Diaporthe eres
- Diaporthe fraxini-angustifoliae
- Diaporthe helianthi
- Diaporthe lagunensis
- Diaporthe litchicola
- Diaporthe lokoyae
- Diaporthe melonis
- Diaporthe orthoceras
- Diaporthe nothofagi
- Diaporthe pascoei
- Diaporthe perniciosa
- Diaporthe phaseolorum
  - Diaporthe phaseolorum var. caulivora
  - Diaporthe phaseolorum var. phaseolorum
  - Diaporthe phaseolorum var. sojae
- Diaporthe rudis
- Diaporthe salicicola
- Diaporthe tanakae
- Diaporthe toxica

== Selected species ==
- Diaporthe abdita
- Diaporthe aberrans
- Diaporthe abutilonis
- Diaporthe acaciae
- Diaporthe acaciigena
- Diaporthe acerina
- Diaporthe actinidiae
- Diaporthe aculeata
- Diaporthe acus
- Diaporthe adunca
- Diaporthe aesculicola
- Diaporthe aetoxici
- Diaporthe affinis
- Diaporthe aggerum
- Diaporthe ahmadii
- Diaporthe ailanthi
  - Diaporthe ailanthi var. ailanthi
  - Diaporthe ailanthi var. megacera
- Diaporthe ailanthicola
- Diaporthe albocincta
- Diaporthe aliena
- Diaporthe alleghaniensis
- Diaporthe alnea
- Diaporthe amaranthi
- Diaporthe ambiens
- Diaporthe americana
- Diaporthe amorphae
- Diaporthe androsaemi
- Diaporthe angelicae
- Diaporthe anisomera
- Diaporthe annonae
- Diaporthe antarctica
- Diaporthe aorista
- Diaporthe apiculosa
- Diaporthe apocrypta
- Diaporthe appendiculata
- Diaporthe araliae
- Diaporthe arctii
  - Diaporthe arctii var. arctii
- Diaporthe artospora
- Diaporthe asclepiadis
- Diaporthe asparagi
- Diaporthe asphodeli
- Diaporthe asteriscina
- Diaporthe astrostoma
- Diaporthe atropuncta
- Diaporthe aucubae
- Diaporthe australafricana
- Diaporthe australis
- Diaporthe austroamericana
- Diaporthe baccharidis
  - Diaporthe baccharidis var. baccharidis
  - Diaporthe baccharidis var. gallica
- Diaporthe bakeri
- Diaporthe bambusae
- Diaporthe baptisiae
- Diaporthe batatas
- Diaporthe beckhausii
- Diaporthe beilharziae
- Diaporthe berlesiana
- Diaporthe bicincta
- Diaporthe biglobosa
- Diaporthe binoculata
  - Diaporthe binoculata var. binoculata
  - Diaporthe binoculata var. clethrae
  - Diaporthe binoculata var. magnoliae-acuminata
- Diaporthe boehmeriae
- Diaporthe bonafidii
- Diaporthe brachystoma
- Diaporthe brenckleana
- Diaporthe brenkleana
- Diaporthe briardiana
- Diaporthe broussonetiae
- Diaporthe buxi
- Diaporthe callicarpae
- Diaporthe calosphaeriodes
- Diaporthe calosphaerioides
- Diaporthe camelliae
- Diaporthe canina
- Diaporthe capsici
- Diaporthe caraganae
- Diaporthe carpini
  - Diaporthe carpini f. carpini
  - Diaporthe carpini f. sordida
  - Diaporthe carpini var. carpini
  - Diaporthe carpini var. quercina
- Diaporthe carpinigera
- Diaporthe caryigena
- Diaporthe castaneti
- Diaporthe castrensis
- Diaporthe castriformis
- Diaporthe casuarinae
- Diaporthe catalpae
- Diaporthe catamarcensis
- Diaporthe ceanothi
- Diaporthe celastrina
- Diaporthe celata
- Diaporthe centrophylli
- Diaporthe cercophora
- Diaporthe cestri
- Diaporthe chailletii
  - Diaporthe chailletii var. chailletii
  - Diaporthe chailletii var. molleri
- Diaporthe chamaeropina
- Diaporthe characiae
- Diaporthe chionanthi
- Diaporthe chrysoides
- Diaporthe ciliata
- Diaporthe cinerascens
- Diaporthe circumscripta
- Diaporthe citri
- Diaporthe citrincola
- Diaporthe claviceps
- Diaporthe clerodendri
- Diaporthe coemansii
- Diaporthe coffeae
- Diaporthe colletiae
- Diaporthe colletiicola
- Diaporthe columbiensis
- Diaporthe compressa
- Diaporthe comptoniae
  - Diaporthe comptoniae var. berolinensis
  - Diaporthe comptoniae var. comptoniae
- Diaporthe concrescens
- Diaporthe coneglanensis
- Diaporthe congener
- Diaporthe congesta
- Diaporthe conigena
- Diaporthe conjucta
- Diaporthe conjuncta
- Diaporthe conradii
- Diaporthe convexa
- Diaporthe corallodendri
- Diaporthe coramblicola
- Diaporthe corni
- Diaporthe cornicola
  - Diaporthe cornicola var. acuta
  - Diaporthe cornicola var. cornicola
- Diaporthe coronillae
- Diaporthe corymbosa
- Diaporthe crassiuscula
- Diaporthe crataegi
- Diaporthe crinigera
- Diaporthe crotalariae
- Diaporthe crustosa
- Diaporthe cryptica
- Diaporthe culta
- Diaporthe cupulata
- Diaporthe curvatispora
- Diaporthe cydoniae
- Diaporthe cydoniicola
- Diaporthe cylindrospora
- Diaporthe cynaroidis
- Diaporthe dakotensis
- Diaporthe decipiens
- Diaporthe decorticans
- Diaporthe delitescens
- Diaporthe delogneana
- Diaporthe demissa
- Diaporthe densa
- Diaporthe densissima
- Diaporthe desmazieri
  - Diaporthe desmazieri var. desmazieri
  - Diaporthe desmazieri var. melampyri
- Diaporthe desmodiana
- Diaporthe desmodii
- Diaporthe detrusa
- Diaporthe dichaenoides
- Diaporthe dickiae
- Diaporthe didymelloides
- Diaporthe difficilior
- Diaporthe digitifera
  - Diaporthe digitifera var. digitifera
  - Diaporthe digitifera var. lignicola
- Diaporthe diospyri
- Diaporthe dircae
- Diaporthe disputata
  - Diaporthe disputata var. disputata
  - Diaporthe disputata var. ulmi
- Diaporthe disseminata
- Diaporthe dolosa
- Diaporthe dorycnea
- Diaporthe dorycnii
- Diaporthe drimydis
- Diaporthe dryophila
- Diaporthe dubia
- Diaporthe dulcamarae
- Diaporthe eburensis
- Diaporthe elaeagni
  - Diaporthe elaeagni var. americana
  - Diaporthe elaeagni var. elaeagni
- Diaporthe elephantina
- Diaporthe ellisii
- Diaporthe epilobii
- Diaporthe epimicta
- Diaporthe eres
- Diaporthe eucalypti
- Diaporthe eucalypticola
- Diaporthe eumorpha
- Diaporthe euonymi
- Diaporthe euryala
- Diaporthe euspina
- Diaporthe eusticha
- Diaporthe exercitalis
- Diaporthe exiguistroma
- Diaporthe extorris
- Diaporthe extranea
- Diaporthe faberi
- Diaporthe fagi
  - Diaporthe fagi var. fagi
  - Diaporthe fagi var. longispora
- Diaporthe fallaciosa
- Diaporthe farinosa
- Diaporthe fasciculata
  - Diaporthe fasciculata f. albizzia
  - Diaporthe fasciculata f. fasciculata
  - Diaporthe fasciculata var. fasciculata
  - Diaporthe fasciculata var. meliloti
- Diaporthe feltgenii
  - Diaporthe feltgenii var. cydoniae
  - Diaporthe feltgenii var. feltgenii
- Diaporthe fibrosa
- Diaporthe flageoletiana
- Diaporthe floresiana
- Diaporthe floridana
- Diaporthe foeniculacea
- Diaporthe forabilis
  - Diaporthe forabilis f. acervata
  - Diaporthe forabilis f. forabilis
- Diaporthe fraxini-angustifoliae
- Diaporthe fuchsiae
- Diaporthe fuckelii
- Diaporthe fuegiana
- Diaporthe furfuracea
- Diaporthe fusispora
- Diaporthe galligena
- Diaporthe gallophila
- Diaporthe garryae
- Diaporthe genistae
- Diaporthe geographica
- Diaporthe geranii
- Diaporthe gillesiana
- Diaporthe gladioli
- Diaporthe glandulosa
- Diaporthe gloriosa
- Diaporthe gorgonoidea
- Diaporthe grammodes
- Diaporthe griseotingens
- Diaporthe halesiae
- Diaporthe hamamelidis
- Diaporthe hederae
- Diaporthe helianthi
- Diaporthe helicis
- Diaporthe hemicrypta
- Diaporthe heveae
- Diaporthe hickoriae
- Diaporthe hippophaës
- Diaporthe hircini
- Diaporthe humboldtiana
- Diaporthe hydrangeae
- Diaporthe hypospilina
- Diaporthe hypoxyloides
- Diaporthe hystricula
- Diaporthe idaeicola
- Diaporthe ilicis
- Diaporthe immaculata
- Diaporthe immersa
- Diaporthe immutabilis
- Diaporthe importata
- Diaporthe impulsa
- Diaporthe inaequalis
- Diaporthe incarcerata
- Diaporthe incompta
- Diaporthe incongrua
- Diaporthe incrustans
- Diaporthe indica
- Diaporthe indigoferae
- Diaporthe inflatula
- Diaporthe innata
- Diaporthe inornata
- Diaporthe insignis
- Diaporthe insularis
- Diaporthe intermedia
- Diaporthe interrupta
- Diaporthe ipomoeae
- Diaporthe italica
- Diaporthe jaffueli
- Diaporthe japonica
- Diaporthe javanica
- Diaporthe jeffueli
- Diaporthe juglandina
- Diaporthe juniperi
- Diaporthe kalmiae
- Diaporthe kellermaniana
- Diaporthe kentrophylli
- Diaporthe ketmiae
- Diaporthe koelreuteriae
- Diaporthe kokiae
- Diaporthe kriegeriana
- Diaporthe kunashirensis
- Diaporthe kunzeana
- Diaporthe kyushuensis
- Diaporthe lagunensis
- Diaporthe landeghemiae
  - Diaporthe landeghemiae f. deutziae-scabrae
  - Diaporthe landeghemiae f. landeghemiae
- Diaporthe larseniana
- Diaporthe laschii
- Diaporthe lentaginis
- Diaporthe leuceriicola
- Diaporthe leucopis
- Diaporthe leucosarca
- Diaporthe leucostroma
- Diaporthe leycesteriae
- Diaporthe leyeesteriae
- Diaporthe libera
- Diaporthe ligulata
- Diaporthe ligustri
- Diaporthe ligustrina
- Diaporthe ligustri-vulgaris
- Diaporthe lineariformis
- Diaporthe linearis
- Diaporthe lirellaeformis
- Diaporthe litchicola
- Diaporthe lithraeae
- Diaporthe lixivia
- Diaporthe lokoyae
- Diaporthe ludwigiana
- Diaporthe lupini
- Diaporthe lusitanicae
- Diaporthe maclurae
- Diaporthe macounii
- Diaporthe macrospora
- Diaporthe macrostalagmia
- Diaporthe macrostoma
- Diaporthe maculans
- Diaporthe maculosa
- Diaporthe magellanica
- Diaporthe magnifica
- Diaporthe magnispora
- Diaporthe magnoliae
- Diaporthe mahoniae
  - Diaporthe mahoniae f. foliicola
  - Diaporthe mahoniae f. mahoniae
- Diaporthe mamiania
  - Diaporthe mamiania var. mamiania
  - Diaporthe mamiania var. valsiformis
- Diaporthe manihotis
- Diaporthe marchica
- Diaporthe marginalis
- Diaporthe mate
- Diaporthe mattfeldii
- Diaporthe mazzantioides
- Diaporthe medusina
- Diaporthe megalospora
- Diaporthe melaena
- Diaporthe melanocarpa
- Diaporthe melongenae
- Diaporthe melonis
  - Diaporthe melonis var. brevistylospora
  - Diaporthe melonis var. melonis
- Diaporthe mendax
- Diaporthe menispermi
- Diaporthe menispermoides
- Diaporthe meridionalis
- Diaporthe mezerei
- Diaporthe microcarpa
- Diaporthe micromegala
- Diaporthe microplaca
- Diaporthe microstoma
- Diaporthe microstroma
- Diaporthe milleriana
- Diaporthe minastri
- Diaporthe minuscula
- Diaporthe minuta
- Diaporthe mitis
- Diaporthe mori
- Diaporthe moriokaensis
- Diaporthe mucosa
- Diaporthe mucronata
- Diaporthe mucronulata
- Diaporthe muehlenbeckiae
- Diaporthe multipunctata
- Diaporthe muralis
- Diaporthe murrayi
- Diaporthe musae
- Diaporthe musigena
- Diaporthe myinda
- Diaporthe neapolitana
- Diaporthe neilliae
- Diaporthe neotheicola
- Diaporthe nepetae
- Diaporthe nerii
- Diaporthe niessliana
- Diaporthe nigrella
- Diaporthe nigricolor
- Diaporthe nigroannulata
- Diaporthe nigrocincta
- Diaporthe nitschkei
- Diaporthe nivosa
- Diaporthe nobilis
- Diaporthe nodosa
- Diaporthe nomurai
- Diaporthe nothofagi
- Diaporthe nucis-avellanae
- Diaporthe oblita
- Diaporthe obsoleta
- Diaporthe occidentalis
- Diaporthe occultata
- Diaporthe ocularia
- Diaporthe oligocarpa
- Diaporthe oligocarpoides
- Diaporthe oncostoma
- Diaporthe ontariensis
- Diaporthe opuli
- Diaporthe orientalis
- Diaporthe orobanches
- Diaporthe orthoceras
  - Diaporthe orthoceras f. achilleae
  - Diaporthe orthoceras f. helianthi
  - Diaporthe orthoceras f. orthoceras
  - Diaporthe orthoceras var. decidua
  - Diaporthe orthoceras var. orthoceras
- Diaporthe ostryigena
- Diaporthe otthii
- Diaporthe oudemansii
- Diaporthe oxyspora
- Diaporthe pachystoma
- Diaporthe padicola
- Diaporthe palmarum
- Diaporthe palustris
- Diaporthe pampeana
- Diaporthe pandanicola
- Diaporthe parabolica
- Diaporthe pardalota
- Diaporthe parvula
- Diaporthe pascoei
- Diaporthe patagonulae
- Diaporthe paulula
- Diaporthe peckiana
- Diaporthe peckii
- Diaporthe pennsylvanica
- Diaporthe perexigua
- Diaporthe perjuncta
- Diaporthe perniciosa
  - Diaporthe perniciosa f. perniciosa
- Diaporthe personata
- Diaporthe petiolarum
- Diaporthe petiolorum
- Diaporthe petrakiana
- Diaporthe phaceliae
- Diaporthe phaseolorum
  - Diaporthe phaseolorum var. batatae
  - Diaporthe phaseolorum var. caulivora
  - Diaporthe phaseolorum var. meridionalis
  - Diaporthe phaseolorum var. phaseolorum
  - Diaporthe phaseolorum var. sojae
- Diaporthe phillyreae
- Diaporthe phoenicis
- Diaporthe pholeodes
- Diaporthe picea
- Diaporthe pimeleae
- Diaporthe pinastri
- Diaporthe pinicola
- Diaporthe pinophylla
- Diaporthe pithya
- Diaporthe placoides
- Diaporthe plantaginis
- Diaporthe platasca
- Diaporthe polygoni
- Diaporthe polygonicola
- Diaporthe pratensis
- Diaporthe prenanthicola
- Diaporthe priva
- Diaporthe pruni
- Diaporthe prunicola
- Diaporthe psoraleae-bituminosae
- Diaporthe pteleae
- Diaporthe pulchella
- Diaporthe pulchra
- Diaporthe pulla
- Diaporthe punctostoma
- Diaporthe punctulata
- Diaporthe pungens
- Diaporthe pusilla
- Diaporthe pustulata
- Diaporthe putator
- Diaporthe pycnostoma
- Diaporthe pyri
- Diaporthe quadruplex
- Diaporthe quercina
- Diaporthe quilmensis
- Diaporthe racemula
- Diaporthe radicina
- Diaporthe radula
- Diaporthe raphani
- Diaporthe recedens
- Diaporthe recondita
- Diaporthe rehmiana
- Diaporthe resecanti
- Diaporthe retecta
- Diaporthe revellens
- Diaporthe rhamnigena
- Diaporthe rhanicensis
- Diaporthe rhoina
- Diaporthe rhois
- Diaporthe rhusicola
- Diaporthe rhynchophora
- Diaporthe ribesia
- Diaporthe ricini
- Diaporthe rickholtii
- Diaporthe robusta
- Diaporthe rubiae
- Diaporthe rudis
- Diaporthe ryckholtii
- Diaporthe saccardoana
  - Diaporthe saccardoana var. moravica
  - Diaporthe saccardoana var. saccardoana
- Diaporthe sacchari
- Diaporthe sachalinensis
- Diaporthe salinicola
- Diaporthe salicicola
- Diaporthe salsuginosa
- Diaporthe salviicola
- Diaporthe samaricola
- Diaporthe sambuci
- Diaporthe santonensis
- Diaporthe sarmenticia
- Diaporthe sarothamni
  - Diaporthe sarothamni var. baccharidis
  - Diaporthe sarothamni var. sarothamni
- Diaporthe scabra
- Diaporthe scandens
- Diaporthe scobina
- Diaporthe scobinoides
- Diaporthe sechalinensis
- Diaporthe semi-immersa
- Diaporthe semi-insculpta
- Diaporthe seneciicola
- Diaporthe seposita
- Diaporthe sheariana
- Diaporthe silvestris
- Diaporthe simplicior
- Diaporthe simulans
- Diaporthe skimmiae
- Diaporthe sociabilis
  - Diaporthe sociabilis var. sambuci
  - Diaporthe sociabilis var. sociabilis
- Diaporthe sociata
- Diaporthe solani-verbascifolii
- Diaporthe sophorae
- Diaporthe sorbariae
- Diaporthe sorbicola
- Diaporthe sordida
- Diaporthe sparsa
- Diaporthe spectabilis
- Diaporthe sphaeralceae
- Diaporthe sphendamnina
- Diaporthe sphingiophora
- Diaporthe spicata
- Diaporthe spiculosa
- Diaporthe spinosula
- Diaporthe spinulosa
- Diaporthe spiraeicola
- Diaporthe spissa
- Diaporthe sponheimeri
- Diaporthe staphylina
- Diaporthe stereostoma
- Diaporthe stewartii
- Diaporthe stictostoma
- Diaporthe stilbostoma
- Diaporthe striiformis
- Diaporthe strumella
  - Diaporthe strumella var. pteleae
  - Diaporthe strumella var. pungens
- Diaporthe strumellaeformis
- Diaporthe subaquila
- Diaporthe subcongrua
- Diaporthe subcorticalis
- Diaporthe subpyramidata
- Diaporthe sydowiana
- Diaporthe syngenesia
  - Diaporthe syngenesia f. nigricolor
  - Diaporthe syngenesia f. syngenesia
- Diaporthe syngenisia
- Diaporthe tageteos
- Diaporthe take
- Diaporthe talae
- Diaporthe tamaricina
- Diaporthe tami
- Diaporthe tanakae
- Diaporthe taxi
- Diaporthe taxicola
- Diaporthe tecomae
- Diaporthe tecta
- Diaporthe tenella
- Diaporthe tenuirostris
- Diaporthe terebinthi
- Diaporthe tetraptera
- Diaporthe tetraspora
- Diaporthe teucrii
- Diaporthe theicola
- Diaporthe therryana
- Diaporthe thujana
- Diaporthe tiliacea
- Diaporthe tillandsiae
- Diaporthe tortuosa
- Diaporthe toxica
- Diaporthe transiens
- Diaporthe transversalis
- Diaporthe trecassium
- Diaporthe trinucleata
- Diaporthe triostei
- Diaporthe tropicalis
- Diaporthe tuberculosa
  - Diaporthe tuberculosa var. corymbosa
  - Diaporthe tuberculosa var. dispersa
  - Diaporthe tuberculosa var. tuberculosa
- Diaporthe tulasnei
  - Diaporthe tulasnei f. galegae
  - Diaporthe tulasnei f. tulasnei
- Diaporthe tumulata
- Diaporthe tupae
- Diaporthe uliginosa
- Diaporthe ulmicola
- Diaporthe utahensis
- Diaporthe vaccinii
- Diaporthe vacillans
- Diaporthe valerianae
- Diaporthe valida
- Diaporthe valparadisiensis
- Diaporthe valsiformis
- Diaporthe varians
- Diaporthe verbenae
- Diaporthe verecunda
- Diaporthe veronicae
- Diaporthe verrucella
- Diaporthe viburni
  - Diaporthe viburni var. viburni
- Diaporthe vincae
- Diaporthe viticola
- Diaporthe wehmeyeri
- Diaporthe winteri
- Diaporthe woodii
- Diaporthe woolworthii
- Diaporthe woroniniae
- Diaporthe xanthii
- Diaporthe xanthiicola
- Diaporthe yerbae
- Diaporthe zaviana
- Diaporthe zeina
- Diaporthe ziziphina
- Diaporthe zopfii
