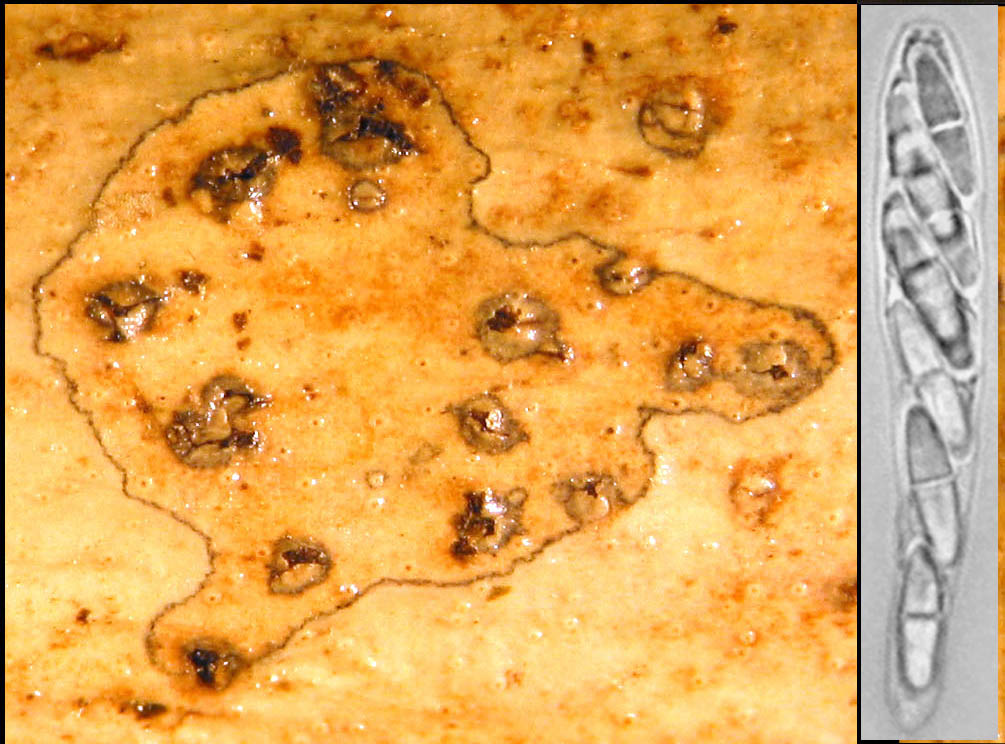
- Allantoporthe leucothoës Lar.N. Vassiljeva

Scientific classification
- Kingdom: Fungi
- Division: Ascomycota
- Class: Sordariomycetes
- Order: Diaporthales
- Family: Diaporthaceae
- Genus: Allantoporthe; Petr. 1921

Species
- Allantoporthe decedens Allantoporthe leucothoës Allantoporthe tessella

= Allantoporthe =

Genus of fungi

Allantoporthe is a genus of fungi within the Diaporthaceae family.
