= Diaporthe lagunensis =

Scientific classification
- Domain: Eukaryota
- Kingdom: Fungi
- Division: Ascomycota
- Class: Sordariomycetes
- Order: Diaporthales
- Family: Diaporthaceae
- Genus: Diaporthe
- Species: D. lagunensis

Binomial name
- Diaporthe lagunensis Sydow and Sydow, 1920

Species of fungus

Diaporthe lagunensis is an endophytic filamentous fungus plant pathogen. It was described in 1920.
