= Aporhytisma =

Scientific classification
- Kingdom: Fungi
- Division: Ascomycota
- Class: Sordariomycetes
- Order: Diaporthales
- Family: Diaporthaceae
- Genus: Aporhytisma; Höhn. 1917
- Species: A. urticae

Binomial name
- Aporhytisma urticae (Fr.) Höhn. 1917

Genus of fungi

Aporhytisma is a monotypic genus of fungi within the Diaporthaceae family. It contains the sole species Aporhytisma urticae.
