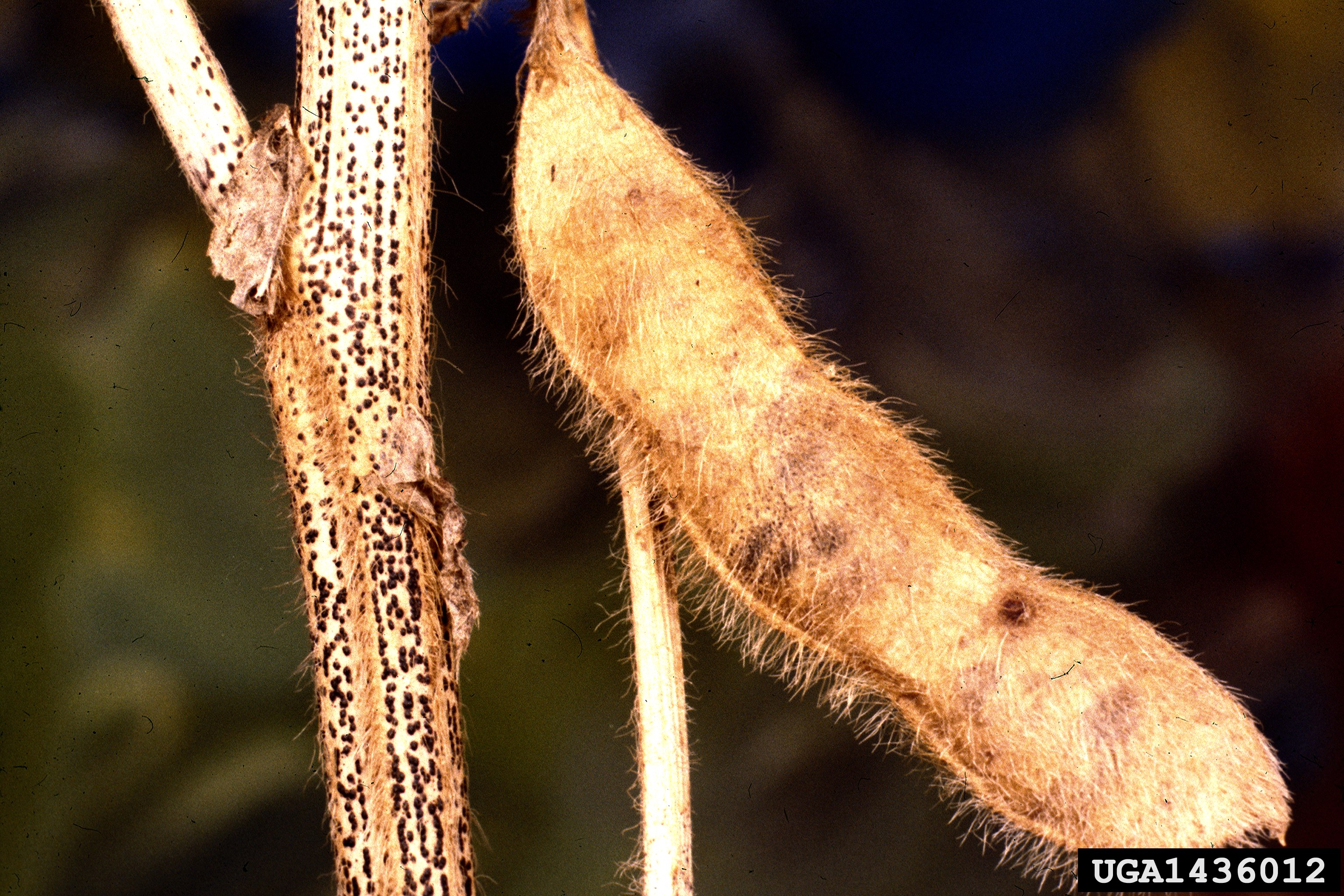
- Diaporthe phaseolorum var. sojae damage to soybean (Glycine max).

Scientific classification
- Domain: Eukaryota
- Kingdom: Fungi
- Division: Ascomycota
- Class: Sordariomycetes
- Order: Diaporthales
- Family: Diaporthaceae
- Genus: Diaporthe
- Species: D. phaseolorum
- Variety: D. p. var. sojae

Trinomial name
- Diaporthe phaseolorum var. sojae (Lehman) Wehm., (1933)

Synonyms
- Diaporthe sojae Phomopsis phaseoli var. sojae Phomopsis sojae

= Diaporthe phaseolorum var. sojae =

Fungal plant pathogen

Diaporthe phaseolorum var. sojae is a plant pathogen infecting soybean and peanut.

Diaporthe phaseolorum var. sojae is the perfect form of the causal pathogen of pod and stem blight of soybean. It is a fungal ascomycete that commonly infects seeds, pods, stems, and petioles. This pathogen is also found in its imperfect state, Phomopsis sojae. This is a common disease of most soybean growing regions in the United States. Losses result from losses in field stands, reductions in yield, and poor seed quality.

== Symptoms ==
Diaporthe phaseolorum var. sojae can infect any above ground parts of the plant; the disease may be present without showing any symptoms.

Early-season infection typically takes place without showing any symptoms.

Mid-season symptoms appear as tiny black dots (pycnidia) on fallen leaves or abscised petioles.

Late-season symptoms (pycnidia) appear on dead stems, branches and seed pods. Heavily infected seeds will often fail to germinate.

Visual symptoms include:

- Light brown spots on cotyledons or lower stems,
- Small black dots (pycnidia) appear in rows along necrotic stem, branch, and petiole tissue (mature leaf tissue is not commonly infected),
- Infected seeds exhibiting: cracked seed coats, shriveling, flattening, grey mold, or black spots (pycnidia) on the seed coat.

== Hosts ==
Alternate hosts include: Lima bean, cowpea, snap beans, peanuts, lespedeza, lupine, pepper, tomato, okra, onion, and garlic.

== Environmental factors ==
Diaporthe phaseolorum var. sojae is present throughout the world wherever soybeans are in production. Conditions that favor this fungal infection include:

- A warm, wet, and humid growing season, particularly during pod development and maturation,
- Continuous soybean planting and infected seed,
- Delayed harvest, insect damage, and hail damage lead to seed infection.

Disease cycle

Diaporthe phaseolorum var. sojae (sexual) and Phomopsis sojae (asexual) overwinter as mycelia in infected seeds and plant debris. This serves as the primary inoculum. In the spring, pycnidium are produced on plant debris and the petioles of abscise leaves.

In the early summer, perithecia develop on decaying stem tissue. The perithecium contain asci while the pycnidium releases conidia. Spores will germinate and penetrate through primarily immature or wounded tissue. Spores need at least 24 hours of free moisture to cause infection. The spores can then spread into mycelium and form perithecia and pycnidia.

More progressive spread of disease can occur through secondary infection. Secondary infections will occur when conidia are dispersed onto different parts of the by the splashing of water.

== Management ==
High quality thoroughly cleaned seed and crop rotation are the primary controls of Diaporthe phaseolorum var. sojae. Resistant varieties are available but not commonly used.

Proper seed treatments will protect seeds and increase stand count. A higher stand count will lead to less branching and breaking of branches. Broken branches provide a point of entry for Diaporthe phaseolorum var. sojae. Harvesting soybeans at first maturity reduces the time of seed infection through the pod. Later maturing varieties tend to produce higher quality soybeans with less infection. When heavily inoculated plant debris is present, a deep tillage option can be taken to bury the residue.
