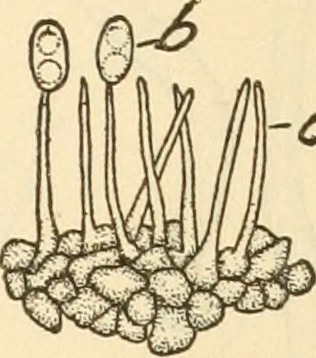
- Diaporthe phaseolorum: long, slender, fragile sporophores (a) with two pycnospores (b) attached

Scientific classification
- Kingdom: Fungi
- Division: Ascomycota
- Class: Sordariomycetes
- Order: Diaporthales
- Family: Diaporthaceae
- Genus: Diaporthe
- Species: D. phaseolorum

Binomial name
- Diaporthe phaseolorum (Cooke & Ellis) Sacc.

= Diaporthe phaseolorum =

Species of fungus

Diaporthe phaseolorum is a plant pathogen with five subspecies:

  - Diaporthe phaseolorum var. batatae
  - Diaporthe phaseolorum var. caulivora
  - Diaporthe phaseolorum var. meridionalis
  - Diaporthe phaseolorum var. phaseolorum
  - Diaporthe phaseolorum var. sojae

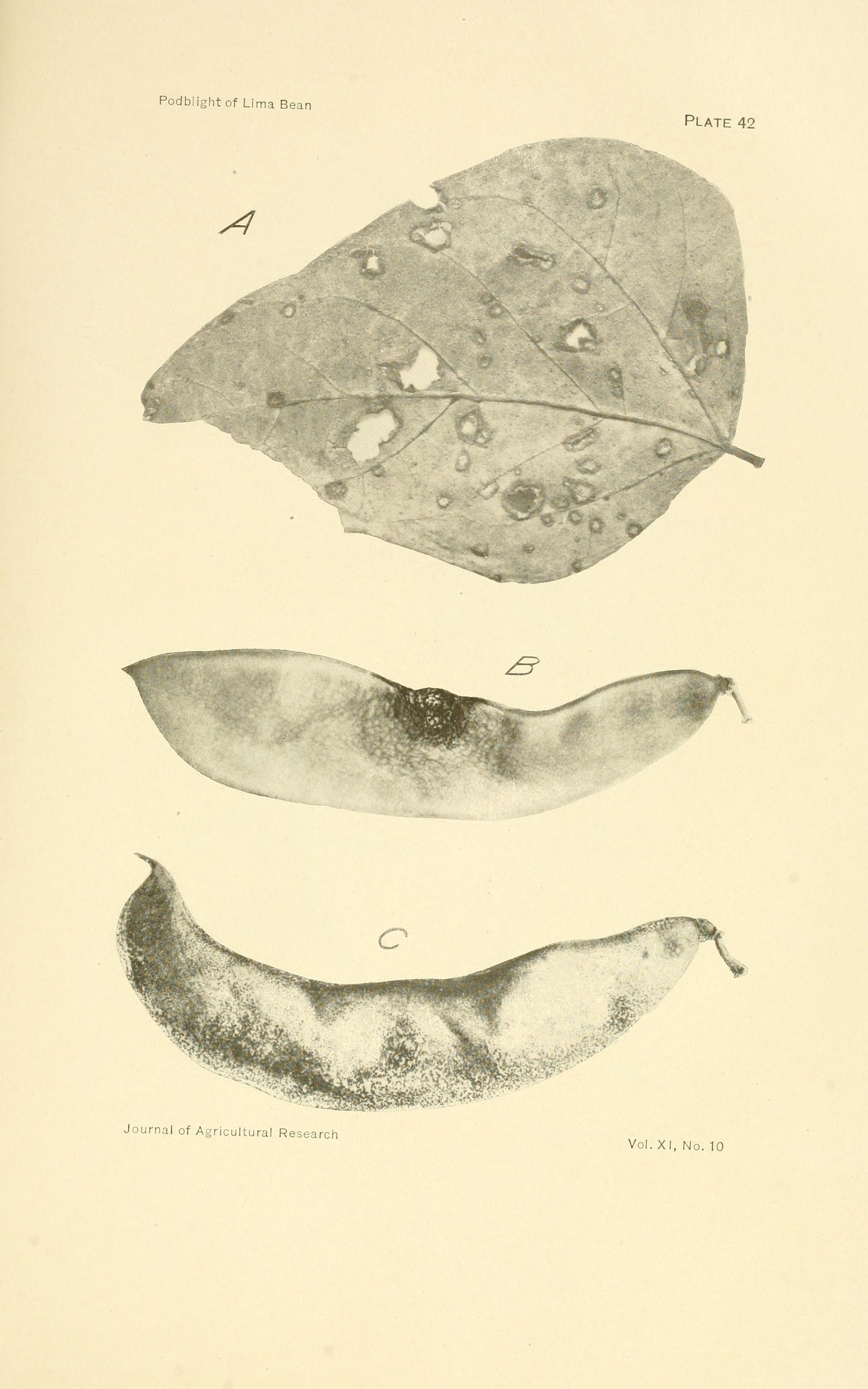
Diaporthe phaseolorum on Phaseolus lunatus

== See also ==
- List of soybean diseases
