= Diaporthe toxica =

Scientific classification
- Kingdom: Fungi
- Division: Ascomycota
- Class: Sordariomycetes
- Order: Diaporthales
- Family: Diaporthaceae
- Genus: Diaporthe
- Species: D. toxica

Binomial name
- Diaporthe toxica P.M. Williamson et al, Mycological Research 98(12): 1367 (1994)

Species of fungus

Diaporthe toxica (anamorph Phomopsis sp. formerly P. leptostromiformis) is a fungal endophyte and occasionally a pathogen of Lupinus spp. The fungus produces secondary metabolites that result in toxicosis of animals such as lupinosis of sheep when infected lupins are ingested. These fungal mycotoxins known as phomopsins cause symptoms expressed as either a severe acute liver disease or as a chronic liver dysfunction syndrome.

The discovery and naming of D. toxica concludes over a century of investigation into the cause of lupinosis since the first major outbreak in Germany in 1872.

The infection process and life cycle in both resistant and susceptible lupins has been fully elucidated. The penetration and formation of saprophytic subcuticular coralloid hyphae occurs soon after the emergence of lupin seedlings. These coralloid latent structures are severely suppressed in resistant lupin varieties. This is the first record of resistance to a saprophytically competent latent infection.

Identifying the cause and understanding the resistance mechanism enabled the development of rapid screening tests and molecular selection techniques for the production of many resistant lupin varieties. Lupinosis is no longer considered a disease of major importance to livestock producers in Western Australia. Another bonus is that grain from resistant lupins can now become part of the human diet.
