= Field lupine =

Field lupine is a common name for several lupines and may refer to:

- Lupinus albus, native to the Mediterranean region and cultivated for its edible seeds
- Lupinus nanus, native to the western United States
- Lupinus mutabilis, Peruvian field lupin
