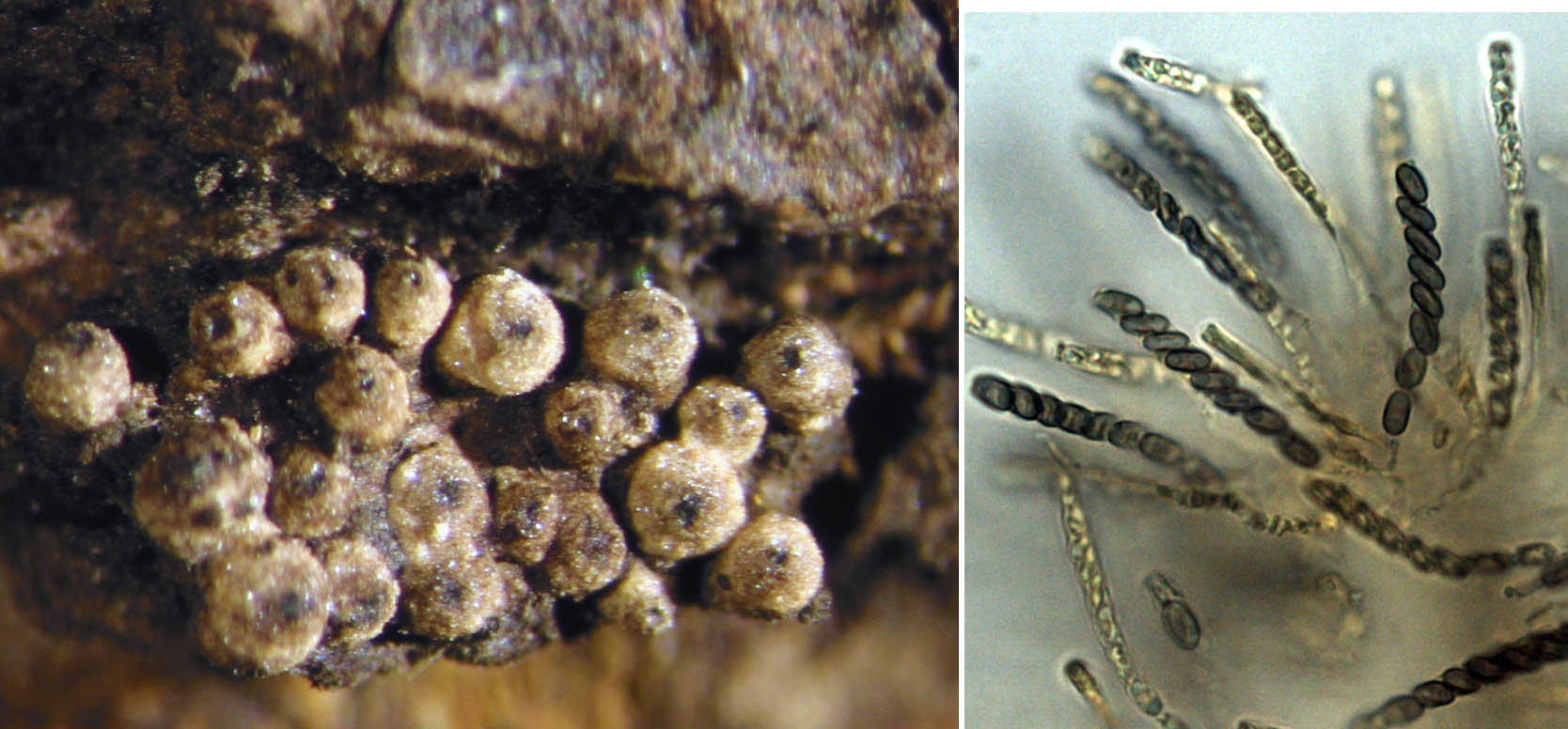
- Chromendothia citrina Lar.N.Vassiljeva

Scientific classification
- Kingdom: Fungi
- Division: Ascomycota
- Class: Sordariomycetes
- Order: Diaporthales
- Family: incertae sedis
- Genus: Chromendothia; Lar.N.Vasiljeva (1993)

Type species
- Chromendothia appendiculata Lar.N.Vassiljeva (1993)

Species
- Chromendothia appendiculata Chromendothia citrina

= Chromendothia =

Genus of fungi

Chromendothia is a genus of fungi in the Diaporthales order, class Sordariomycetes. The relationship of this taxon to other taxa within the order is unknown (incertae sedis).
