= Keinstirschia =

Scientific classification
- Kingdom: Fungi
- Division: Ascomycota
- Class: Sordariomycetes
- Order: Diaporthales
- Family: incertae sedis
- Genus: Keinstirschia; J.Reid & C.Booth (1989)

Type species
- Keinstirschia megalosperma (Kirschst.) J.Reid & C.Booth (1989)

Genus of fungi

Keinstirschia is a genus of fungi in the order Diaporthales, class Sordariomycetes. The relationship of this taxon to other taxa within the order is unknown (incertae sedis). A monotypic genus, Keinstirschia contains the single species Keinstirschia megalosperma, originally described as Cryptosporella megalosperma by German mycologist Wilhelm Kirschstein in 1939.
