= Hercospora =

Scientific classification
- Kingdom: Fungi
- Division: Ascomycota
- Class: Sordariomycetes
- Order: Diaporthales
- Genus: Hercospora; Fr. (1825)

Type species
- Hercospora tiliae (Pers.) Tul. & C.Tul. (1863)

Genus of fungi

Hercospora is a genus of fungi within the Diaporthales order, class Sordariomycetes. The relationship of this taxon to other taxa within the order is unknown (incertae sedis).

== Species ==
- Hercospora ahmadii
- Hercospora binoculata
- Hercospora carpini
- Hercospora circumscissa
- Hercospora concinna
- Hercospora coryli
- Hercospora digitifera
- Hercospora erythropyrenia
- Hercospora kornhuberi
- Hercospora magnoliae-acuminatae
- Hercospora nigrescens
- Hercospora stromatica
- Hercospora tiliae
