= Sphaerognomoniella =

Scientific classification
- Kingdom: Fungi
- Division: Ascomycota
- Class: Sordariomycetes
- Order: Diaporthales
- Family: incertae sedis
- Genus: Sphaerognomoniella; Naumov & Kusnezowa

Genus of fungi

Sphaerognomoniella is a genus of fungi within the Diaporthales order, class Sordariomycetes. The relationship of this taxon to other taxa within the order is unknown (incertae sedis). According to the 2007 Outline of Ascomycota, the placement of this genus in the Diapthorales order is uncertain.
