= Schizoparme straminea =

Scientific classification
- Kingdom: Fungi
- Division: Ascomycota
- Class: Dothideomycetes
- Genus: Schizoparme
- Species: S. straminea

Binomial name
- Schizoparme straminea Shear (1923)

Species of fungus

Schizoparme straminea is a plant pathogen infecting strawberries.
