= Cryptonectriella =

Scientific classification
- Kingdom: Fungi
- Division: Ascomycota
- Class: Sordariomycetes
- Order: Diaporthales
- Family: incertae sedis
- Genus: Cryptonectriella (Höhn.) Weese (1919)

Genus of fungi

Cryptonectriella is a genus of fungi within the Diaporthales order, class Sordariomycetes. The relationship of this taxon to other taxa within the order is unknown (incertae sedis).
