= Cryptoleptosphaeria =

Scientific classification
- Kingdom: Fungi
- Division: Ascomycota
- Class: Sordariomycetes
- Order: Diaporthales
- Family: incertae sedis
- Genus: Cryptoleptosphaeria; Petr. (1923)

Type species
- Cryptoleptosphaeria moravica Petr. (1923)

Genus of fungi

Cryptoleptosphaeria is a fungal genus in the order Diaporthales, class Sordariomycetes. The relationship of this taxon to other taxa within the order is unknown (incertae sedis). Cryptoleptosphaeria is monotypic, containing the single species Cryptoleptosphaeria moravica.
