= Pedumispora =

Scientific classification
- Kingdom: Fungi
- Division: Ascomycota
- Class: Dothideomycetes
- Subclass: incertae sedis
- Genus: Pedumispora; K.D.Hyde & E.B.G.Jones (1992)

Type species
- Pedumispora rhizophorae K.D.Hyde & E.B.G.Jones (1992)

Genus of fungi

Pedumispora is a genus of fungi in the class Dothideomycetes. The relationship of this taxon to other taxa within the class is unknown (incertae sedis).
