= Schizoparme =

Scientific classification
- Kingdom: Fungi
- Division: Ascomycota
- Class: Dothideomycetes
- Subclass: incertae sedis
- Genus: Schizoparme; Shear

Species
- Species include: Schizoparme straminea

Genus of fungi

Schizoparme is a genus of fungi in the class Dothideomycetes. The relationship of this taxon to other taxa within the class is unknown (incertae sedis). Also, the placement of this genus within the Dothideomycetes is uncertain. But in 2016, one paper introduce Schizoparme is sexual morph of fungi genera of Coniella.
