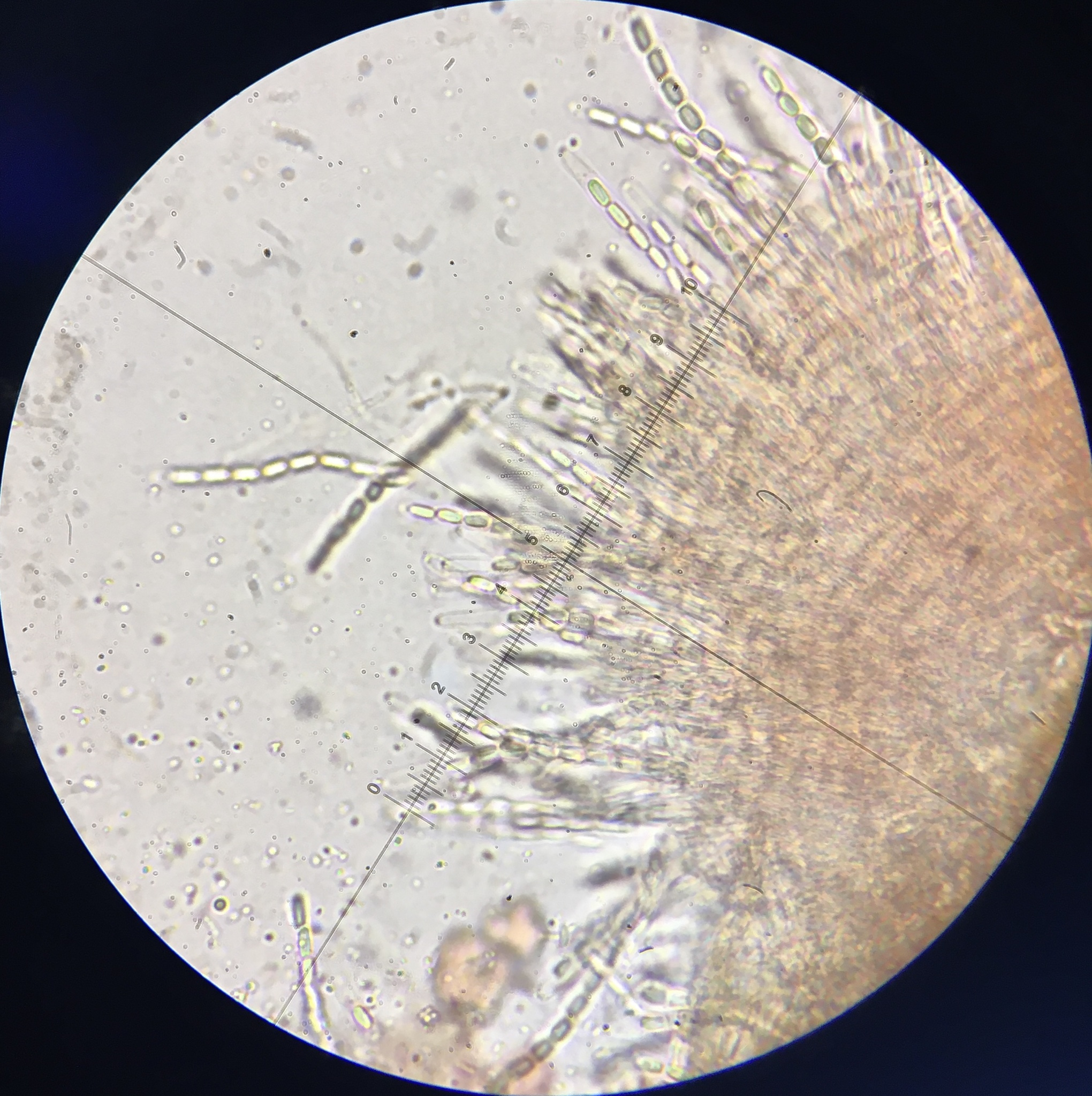
- Phomatospora coprophila

Scientific classification
- Kingdom: Fungi
- Division: Ascomycota
- Class: Sordariomycetes
- Order: Phomatosporales
- Family: Phomatosporaceae
- Genus: Phomatospora; Sacc.

Type species
- Phomatospora berkeleyi Sacc.

Synonyms
- Cryptonectriopsis (F.von Höhnel) Weese, 1919; Heteropera Theissen, 1917

= Phomatospora =

Genus of fungi

Phomatospora is a genus of fungi within the class Sordariomycetes, and since 2016, in the family Phomatosporaceae and order Phomatosporales. They are found in terrestrial, freshwater and marine habitats, across the world except Russia and Canada.

== Species ==
As accepted by Species Fungorum;

- Phomatospora acaciae Sousa da Câmara (1936)
- Phomatospora acrostichi K.D. Hyde (1988)
- Phomatospora admontensis Nograsek (1991)
- Phomatospora albomaculans Tak. Kobay. & K. Sasaki (1982)
- Phomatospora anacardiicola Bat. (1957)
- Phomatospora annonae Bat. & Cif. (1957)
- Phomatospora aquatica Minoura & T. Muroi (1978)
- Phomatospora archontophoenicis Joanne E. Taylor, K.D. Hyde & E.B.G. Jones (2003)
- Phomatospora arenaria Sacc., E. Bommer & M. Rousseau (1890)
- Phomatospora argentina Speg. (1880)
- Phomatospora artocarpi T.S. Ramakr. & Sundaram (1953)
- Phomatospora aucubae (Shirai & Hara) Tak. Kobay. & Y. Suto (1983)
- Phomatospora bellaminuta Kohlm., Volkm.-Kohlm. & O.E. Erikss. (1995)
- Phomatospora berkeleyi Sacc. (1875)
- Phomatospora biseriata Senan., Camporesi & K.D. Hyde (2016)
- Phomatospora caricicola Petr. (1929)
- Phomatospora concinna Petr. (1954)
- Phomatospora convolvuli Gonz. Frag. & Cif. (1925)
- Phomatospora coprophila M.J. Richardson (1972)
- Phomatospora cylindrotheca Petr. (1953)
- Phomatospora cymbisperma (Speg.) Petr. & Syd. (1934)
- Phomatospora dinemasporium J. Webster (1955)
- Phomatospora endopteris W. Phillips & Plowr. (1885)
- Phomatospora errabunda Petr. & Cif. (1932)
- Phomatospora feltgenii Sacc. & P. Syd. (1902)
- Phomatospora feurichiana Kirschst. (1939)
- Phomatospora filarszkyi Petr. (1923)
- Phomatospora gelatinospora M.E. Barr (1970)
- Phomatospora hederae Feltgen (1901)
- Phomatospora heveae Saccas (1954)
- Phomatospora hyalina (Griffiths) Cain (1933)
- Phomatospora ingae Syd. (1939)
- Phomatospora insignis Petr. (1925)
- Phomatospora juncicola (Jaap) L. Holm (2012)
- Phomatospora kamatii Tilak & Talde (1980)
- Phomatospora kandeliae K.D. Hyde (1992)
- Phomatospora kentiae Speg. (1909)
- Phomatospora leptasca (Peck & Clinton) J. Reid & C. Booth (1966)
- Phomatospora lithocarpi M.E. Barr (1994)
- Phomatospora luteotingens J. Fourn. & Lechat (2010)
- Phomatospora macarangae Hansf. (1957)
- Phomatospora minutella (Peck) M.E. Barr (1994)
- Phomatospora minutissima (Sacc.) N. Lundq. (1972)
- Phomatospora miurana I. Hino & Katum. (1966)
- Phomatospora moravica Petr. (1924)
- Phomatospora muskellungensis Fallah & Shearer (1998)
- Phomatospora napoleoneae (Thüm.) Aa (2002)
- Phomatospora nypae K.D. Hyde (1993)
- Phomatospora nypicola K.D. Hyde & Alias (1999)
- Phomatospora opuntiae Bat. & A.F. Vital (1955)
- Phomatospora oryzopsidis Sousa da Câmara (1932)
- Phomatospora pandani (Ellis & Everh.) Theiss. (1917)
- Phomatospora paulensis Rehm (1907)
- Phomatospora phragmiticola Poon & K.D. Hyde (1998)
- Phomatospora podocarpi Syd. (1930)
- Phomatospora punctulata I. Hino & Katum. (1958)
- Phomatospora radegundensis Scheuer (1988)
- Phomatospora ribesia (Cooke & Massee) Sacc. (1891)
- Phomatospora rosae Rehm (1913)
- Phomatospora saccardoi Rehm (1882)
- Phomatospora salvadorina S. Ahmad (1948)
- Phomatospora sandwicensis Petr. (1953)
- Phomatospora secalina Feltgen (1903)
- Phomatospora sphaerulina Grove (1922)
- Phomatospora striatigera Scheuer (1988)
- Phomatospora striatispora M.E. Barr (1994)
- Phomatospora stroggylospora M.E.A. Costa & Sousa da Câmara (1953)
- Phomatospora tamarindi Dhaware (1982)
- Phomatospora trevoae Speg. (1910)
- Phomatospora triseptata Raja & Shearer (2008)
- Phomatospora uniseriata Phukhams., M.V. de Bult & K.D. Hyde (2020)
- Phomatospora viticola Senan., Camporesi & K.D. Hyde (2016)
- Phomatospora wisteriae Ellis & Everh. (1902)
