= Bernhard Auerswald =

German mycologist (1818–1870)

Bernhard Auerswald (March 19, 1818 – June 30, 1870) was a German mycologist and professor from Leipzig. He participated as chief correspondent of botany, sending specimens that his colleague Heinrich Moritz Willkomm collected and sent to him from his expeditions.

== Published works ==
- Botanische Unterhaltungen zum Verständniss der heimathlichen Flora. Leipzig: H. Mendelssohn, 1858
- Anleitung zum rationellen Botanisiren. Leipzig: Veit & Comp., 1860
- Unsere Heimats-Kräuter als Hausmittel: Eine ausführliche Beschreibung aller heilwirkenden Pflanzen und Kräuter deren Fundort, praktische Verwendung und Verwertung in den verschiedensten Krankheitsfällen des menschlichen Lebens. Nach den neuesten und besten Quellen bearbeitet. Dresden 1860
- Pyrenomycetes novi ex herbario Heufleriano. Wien: C. Ueberreuter, 1868
- Pyrenomycetum aliquot novae species tirolenses. 1868
- Synopsis Pyrenomycetum europaeorum. Dresden: Heinrich 1869

The abbreviation Auersw. is used when citing Auerswald as the author in scientific classification of vegetables.
