= Lupinosis =

Disease of grazing animals

- Other names: Phomopsin toxicosis
- Specialty: Veterinary medicine, Toxicology
- Symptoms: Liver damage, jaundice, lethargy, inappetence, death
- Complications: Abortion, reduced lambing, poor wool quality, nutritional myopathy
- Usual onset: Acute, subacute, or chronic
- Duration: Variable depending on exposure
- Causes: Ingestion of phomopsins produced by Diaporthe toxica
- Risk factors: Grazing on dead lupin plants (especially in summer/autumn)
- Diagnostic method: Histopathology, clinical signs, grazing history
- Prevention: Avoid grazing lupin stubble or infected plants
- Treatment: Supportive care, removal from toxic feed
- Prognosis: Poor if severe liver damage is present
- Frequency: Endemic in parts of Western Australia
- Deaths: Significant economic losses in livestock

Lupinosis, also known as phomopsin toxicosis or mycotoxinic lupinosis, is a mycotoxicosis primarily affecting sheep, caused by ingestion of phomopsins—mycotoxins produced by the fungus Diaporthe toxica (formerly identified as Phomopsis leptostromiformis). The fungus colonizes lupin plants following seed emergence but lies dormant until saprophytic growth occurs when plants senesce at the end of the season. The disease has also been reported in cattle, goats, donkeys, horses, and pigs, and has been experimentally induced in various other species, including rabbits, guinea pigs, mice, rats, dogs, ducklings, and chickens.

First recognized in Germany in 1872 following numerous sheep deaths linked to lupin ingestion, lupinosis has since been reported in countries such as the United States, Poland, New Zealand, Australia, South Africa, and Spain. In Australia, particularly Western Australia, where lupin stubble is extensively used as fodder, the disease has had a significant economic impact. In 1983, lupinosis was estimated to cause an annual economic loss of $16.3 million (1983 AUD).

Clinically, lupinosis is characterized by severe liver damage, leading to symptoms such as inappetence, weight loss, lethargy, jaundice, and often death. Microscopically, the disease is marked by arrested and abnormal mitosis of hepatocytes. The disease course may be acute, subacute, or chronic, depending on the amount and duration of phomopsin exposure. Additional effects include reproductive issues like abortions in late pregnancy, embryonic deaths, reduced lambing percentages, decreased wool production and quality, nutritional myopathy, and starvation ketosis in cattle.

== History ==
Lupinosis was first recognized as a disease in Germany in 1872, when numerous sheep deaths were associated with ingesting lupin plants. Early studies in the 1880s and 1890s isolated a fungus named Cryptosporidium leptospirosis (Kühn) from affected plants, but a definitive causal link to the disease was not established at that time.

In Western Australia, lupinosis was first recorded in 1948 in sheep grazing dead plants of Lupinus cosentinii. Subsequent outbreaks occurred annually during summer and autumn, particularly affecting sheep grazing on dead bitter lupin plants or stubbles of sweet, narrow-leafed lupins.

Research in the 1960s identified a toxicogenic fungus as the likely cause of lupinosis. In 1966, studies in Western Australia demonstrated that non-toxic lupins could be rendered toxic by inoculating them with a mixed fungal suspension from toxic lupins. Initially, the causative fungus was thought to be a Cytospora or Pleospora species.

In 1969, a severe outbreak in South Africa led to isolating a fungus identified as Phomopsis leptostromiformis (Kühn) Bubák, which reproduced the disease in sheep under experimental conditions. Further studies concluded that P. leptostromiformis and P. rossiana were the same species, with synonyms including Cryptosporium leptostromiforme and Phoma rossiana.

In 1975, the teleomorph (sexual stage) of P. leptostromiformis was described as Diaporthe woodii but in 2015 was reclassified as Diaporthe leptostromiformis.

A study in 1991 found two varieties of P. leptostroformis and that only one, P. leptostromiformis var leptostromiformis, produced high levels of the toxin. Subsequent research in 1994 identified a new and distinct teleomorph of the toxicogenic variety and named it Diaporthe toxica, establishing it as the true causative agent of lupinosis.

The identification of D. toxica concluded over a century of investigation into the cause of lupinosis, providing clarity on the disease's etiology and facilitating the development of resistant lupin varieties.
