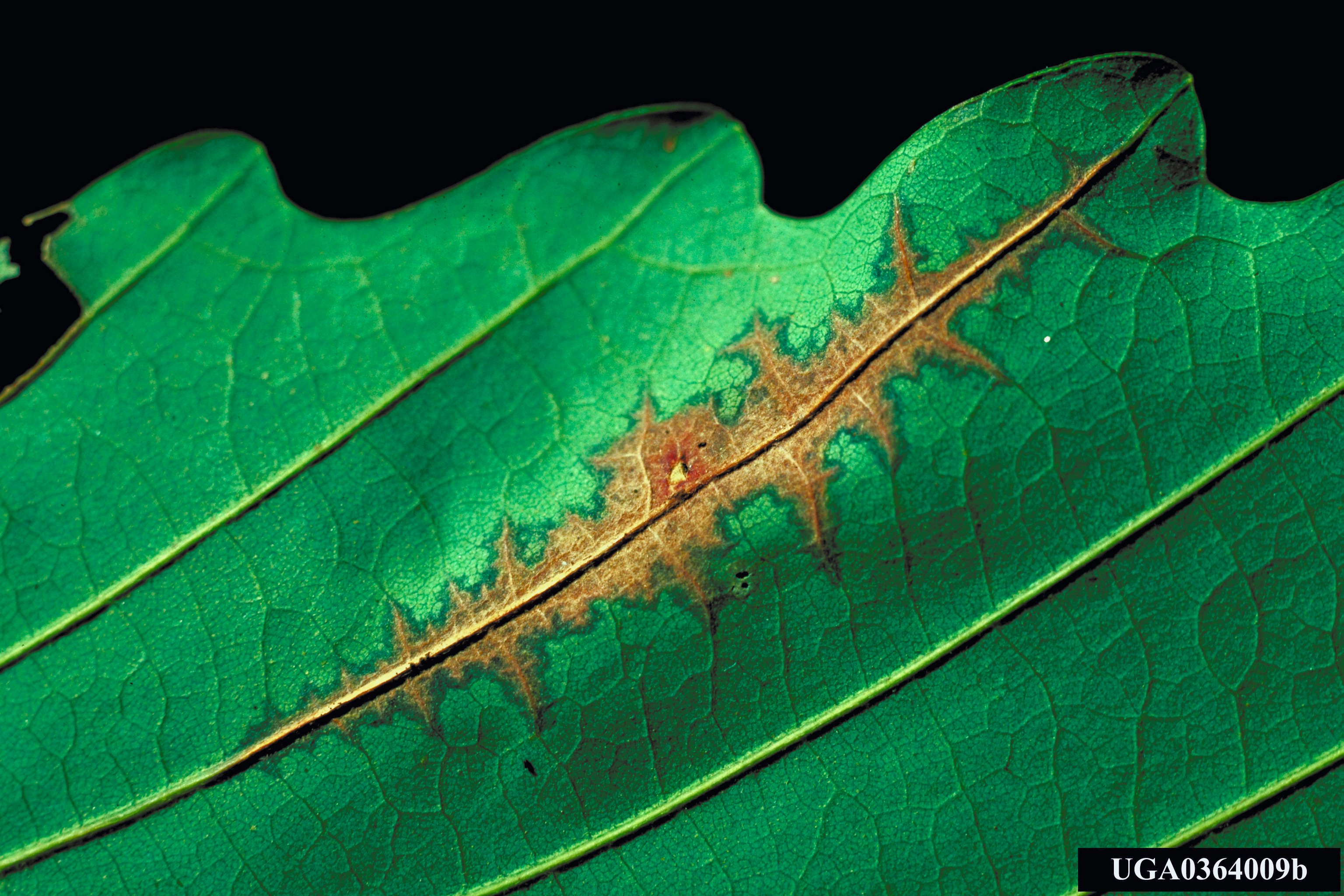
- leaf symptoms of Apiognomonia errabunda

Scientific classification
- Kingdom: Fungi
- Division: Ascomycota
- Class: Sordariomycetes
- Subclass: Sordariomycetidae
- Order: Diaporthales; Nannf. (1932)

Families
- (with number of genera): Apiosporopsidaceae (1); Apoharknessiaceae (2); Asterosporiaceae (1); Auratiopycnidiellaceae (1); Coryneaceae (2); Cryphonectriaceae (27); Cytosporaceae (6); Diaporthaceae (15); Diaporthosporellaceae (1); Diaporthostomataceae (1); Dwiroopaceae (1); Erythrogloeaceae (4); Foliocryphiaceae (2); Gnomoniaceae (37); Harknessiaceae (2); Juglanconidaceae (2); Lamproconiaceae (2); Macrohilaceae (1); Mastigosporellaceae (1); Melanconidaceae (1); Melanconiellaceae (7); Neomelanconiellaceae (1); Phaeoappendicosporaceae (2); Prosopidicolaceae (1); Pseudomelanconidaceae (3); Pseudoplagiostomataceae(1); Pyrisporaceae (1); Schizoparmaceae (1); Stilbosporaceae (4); Sydowiellaceae (16); Synnemasporellaceae (1); Tubakiaceae (8)

= Diaporthales =

Order of fungi

Diaporthales is an order of sac fungi.

Wijayawardene et al. in 2020 added a number of name families to the order.

Diaporthales includes a number of plant pathogenic fungi, the most notorious of which is Cryphonectria parasitica (Murrill) Barr, the chestnut blight fungus that altered the landscape of eastern North America. Other diseases caused by members of this order include stem canker of soybeans (Diaporthe phaseolorum (Cooke & Ellis) Sacc. and its varieties), stem-end rot of citrus fruits (Diaporthe citri F.A. Wolf), and peach canker disease (Phomopsis amygdali Del.).

Some species produce secondary metabolites that result in toxicosis of animals such as lupinosis of sheep (Diaporthe toxica P.M. Williamson et al.). A number of asexually reproducing plant pathogenic fungi also belong in the Diaporthales, such Greeneria uvicola (Berk. & Curt.) Punith., cause of bitter rot of grape, and Discula destructiva Redlin, cause of dogwood anthracnose, both of which are mitotic diaporthalean species with no known sexual state.

== Genera incertae sedis ==
The following genera within the Diaporthales have an uncertain taxonomic placement (incertae sedis), according to the 2007 Outline of Ascomycota. A question mark preceding the genus name means that the placement of that genus within this order is uncertain.

- Anisomycopsis
- Apiosporopsis
- Caudospora
- Chromendothia
- Cryptoleptosphaeria
- Cryptonectriella
- Cryptonectriopsis
- Dendrostoma
- ?Exormatostoma
- Hercospora
- Jobellisia
- Keinstirschia
- Lollipopaia
- Pedumispora
- Pseudocryptosporella
- Pseudothis
- Savulescua
- Schizoparme
- Sphaerognomoniella
- Stioclettia
- ?Trematovalsa
- Vismya
