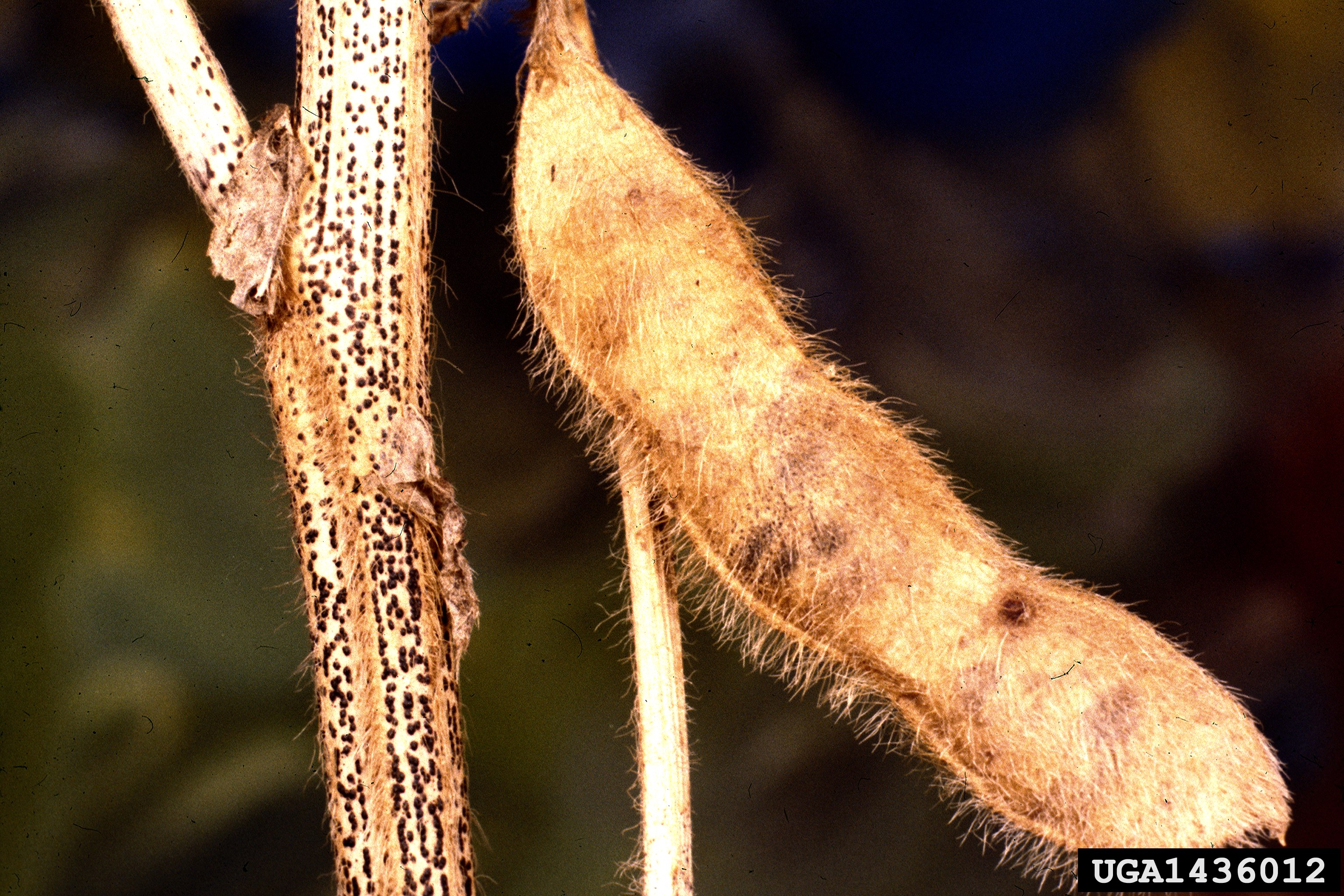
- Diaporthe phaseolorum var. sojae damage on soybean plant

Scientific classification
- Kingdom: Fungi
- Division: Ascomycota
- Class: Sordariomycetes
- Order: Diaporthales
- Family: Diaporthaceae; Höhn. ex Wehm., 1926

Type genus
- Diaporthe Nitschke 1870

= Diaporthaceae =

Family of fungi

Diaporthaceae is a family of fungal plant pathogens.

== Genera ==
- Allantoporthe
- Aporhytisma
- Clypeoporthella
- Diaporthe
- Diaporthopsis
- Leucodiaporthe
- Mazzantia
- Mazzantiella
- Phomopsis
- Septomazzantia
