= Lasiodiplodia hormozganensis =

Scientific classification
- Kingdom: Fungi
- Division: Ascomycota
- Class: Dothideomycetes
- Order: Botryosphaeriales
- Family: Botryosphaeriaceae
- Genus: Lasiodiplodia
- Species: L. hormozganensis

Binomial name
- Lasiodiplodia hormozganensis Abdollahzadeh et al., 2010

Species of fungus

Lasiodiplodia hormozganensis is an endophytic fungus. It was first isolated in Hormozgan Province, Iran, from Mangifera indica, and has since been isolated in other plants in other continents, and is considered a plant pathogen. This species is phylogenetically related to L. citricola and L. parva but is distinguished by their conidial dimensions and length of their paraphyses. Conidia of L. hormozganensis are larger than those of L. parva, albeit smaller than those of L. citricola. Paraphyses of L. hormozganensis are shorter than in L. parva and L. citricola.

== Description ==
Its conidiomata are stromatic and pycnidial; mycelium uniloculate, up to 950μm in size, being non-papillate with a central ostiole. Its paraphyses are hyaline and cylindrical. Conidiophores are absent in this species. Its conidiogenous cells are holoblastic and smooth, while its conidia are aseptate and cylindrical.
