= Cophinforma tumefaciens =

Scientific classification
- Kingdom: Fungi
- Division: Ascomycota
- Class: Dothideomycetes
- Order: Botryosphaeriales
- Family: Botryosphaeriaceae
- Genus: Cophinforma
- Species: C. tumefaciens

Binomial name
- Cophinforma tumefaciens (Hedges) F. Liu, Crous & L. Cai

Synonyms
- Sphaeropsis tumefaciens Hedges, Phytopathology 1: 64 (1911) Sphaeropsis tumefaciens var. citri N.D. Sharma, Curr. Sci. 43(12): 382 (1974)

Species of fungus

Cophinforma tumefaciens is an ascomycete fungus that is a plant pathogen infecting citruses, and other shrubs and trees.

== History ==
It was published in 1911, as Sphaeropsis tumefaciens with the holotype found on Citrus limon in Jamaica. But it was transferred to Cophinforma tumefaciens in 2021. Due to the generic circumscriptions of the macroconidia and spermatia/microconidia of this species matching that of Botryosphaeria, Cophinforma, or Neofusicoccum genera, rather than genus Sphaeropsis.

== Description ==
It can form galls (rounded swellings beneath undisturbed bark) on Edison's St. John's-Wort (Hypericum edisonianum (Small) Adams & Robson) in Florida. 'Sphaeropsis gall' also affects holly bushes as well. Many other plant genera in Florida and other places are also known to be affected by this disease, including citrus, lime (Citrus aurantifolia), oleander, holly (Ilex spp.), bottlebrush (Callistemon spp), Carissa, crape myrtle, Ligustrum and the Brazilian Peppertree (Schinus terebinthifolius). as well as rose bay (Nerium oleander) and avocado (Persea americana Mill). Other host plants include: cashew trees (Anacardium occidentale), Bauhinia spp., Cinnamomum camphora, Citrofortunella mitis, Eucalyptus sp., (including Eucalyptus cinerea and Eucalyptus urophylla), Eugenia sp., Jatropha sp., Lagerstroemia indica, Mangifera indica, Morus alba, Myrica cerifera, Pittosporum tobira, Poncirus trifoliate, Portlandia grandiflora, Pyracantha coccinea, Vigna angularis and Wisteria sinensis.

The mycelium have conidiomata which are pycnidial, superficial or semi-immersed and measureing 135–400 μm in diam. They are solitary or confluent, dark brown to black (in colour), complex, effuse, (sub-)globose, densely covered with dark brown hyphae. The condia wall is composed of three layers, an outer layer of wall (textura angularis), thick-walled and dark to light brown in shade, the middle layer of cells are thin-walled and light brown. The inner layer of cells are also thin-walled and hyaline (glass-like). The conidiophores are also hyaline, branched, or reduced to conidiogenous cells. The conidiogenous cells are hyaline, holoblastic (divided into planes), smooth, discrete and cylindrical in form. They measure about 11-20(-24) × 2.5 -4 μm. The conidia are hyaline, thin-walled, aseptate, granular, ellipsoid to obovoid (in form), 18–31.5 × 7.5-10 μm. The spermatophores are hyaline, smooth, branched, or reduced to solitary spermatogenous cells. They occur randomly among the conidiophores in the same conidioma. The spermatogenous cells are ampulliform (flask-shaped) or sub-cylindrical in form. They measure about 8–21 × 2.5–4.5 μm. The spermatia are hyaline, smooth, cylindrical (in form), straight or slightly curved. The apex is obtuse and the base is truncate, measuring 3.5–7.5 × 1.5–2.5 μm.

Disease symptoms range from inconspicuous swellings on young twigs to irregular sized galls on older wood. They are usually rounded (1–7 cm (0.4–2.8 in) in diam.) but sometimes elongated. These swellings start covered with normal bark which then mutates into a whitish, rough, cork-like tissue, this begins to grow in size, becoming fissured, with much enlarged woody tissue. The knots are firmly attached to the stem or branch, and may occur in large numbers over considerable lengths of stem which may be girdled. The surface of the knot later may become soft and crumbling, but the centre is hard, where the presence of black streaking indicates the presence of mycelium. Multiple shoots can appear from the galled areas, causing a witches broom type of growth. Galls can form up to 40 shoots, some over 1 m long. Horizontal branches can also tip up to grow nearly vertically and dieback of infected branches eventually occurs. The knots can occur in large numbers and a severe infection can lead to death of the tree or shrub. The disease is related to water stress, causing more dieback and can cause the plant to eventually die. This often occurs when warm, wet weather follows periods of drought.

== Geographic distribution ==
The disease has been reported as being found in the USA (within Florida), Cameroon, Ceylon, Cuba, Egypt, Guyana, Indonesia, India, Jamaica, Mexico, Puerto Rico, and Venezuela. Also by 2021, it was also found in Japan, Pakistan, West Indies and in Europe (within Austria and Greece).
