= Barriopsis iraniana =

Scientific classification
- Kingdom: Fungi
- Division: Ascomycota
- Class: Dothideomycetes
- Order: Botryosphaeriales
- Family: Botryosphaeriaceae
- Genus: Barriopsis
- Species: B. iraniana

Binomial name
- Barriopsis iraniana Abdollahzadeh et al., 2009

Species of fungus

Barriopsis iraniana is an endophytic fungus first found on Citrus, Mangifera and Olea species in Iran.
