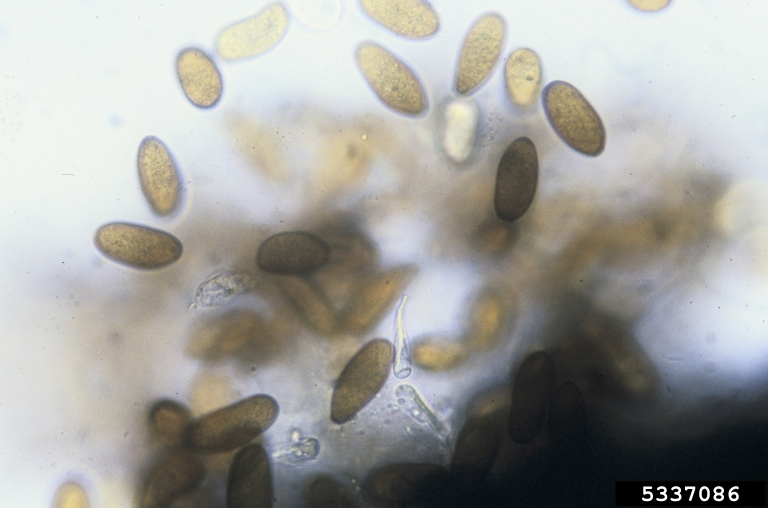
- Asexual Spore (conidia) of fungus : Diplodia blight (Sphaeropsis ; incertae sedis)

Scientific classification
- Kingdom: Fungi
- Division: Ascomycota
- Class: Dothideomycetes
- Order: Botryosphaeriales
- Family: Botryosphaeriaceae
- Genus: Sphaeropsis; Sacc. (1880)

Type species
- Sphaeropsis visci (Alb. & Schwein.) Sacc.

Synonyms
- Botrysphaeris F.E.Clements & Shear, 1931; Gyratylium Preuss, 1855; Sphaeropsis Lév.

= Sphaeropsis =

Genus of fungi

The Sphaeropsis are a genus of fungi, within the family Botryosphaeriaceae, the order Botryosphaeriales, and the class Dothideomycetes. They are plant pathogens.

Most known species is Sphaeropsis sapinea (Fr.) Dyko & B. Sutton (1980) (or Diplodia sapinea (Fr.) Fuckel and Diplodia pinea (Desm.) J. Kickx f.), which is the causal agent of the Diplodia tip blight disease on pines and other conifer species. It is also found on forest and ornamental trees in the Western Balkans, Europe, and in the United States.

== History ==
The genus Sphaeropsis was introduced by Saccardo in 1880 (for several species of Diplodia with brown, aseptate conidia), with Sphaeropsis visci named as the type species. Sphaeropsis was later found to be the asexual morph of Phaeobotryosphaeria (Phillips et al. 2008, 2013; Wijayawardene et al. 2017).

== Distribution ==
Species in Sphaeropsis have a cosmopolitan distribution since they have been recorded from both temperate and tropical countries. Including; Germany, Namibia, New Zealand, South Africa, Thailand, (Phillips et al. 2013; Slippers et al. 2014; Farr and Rossman 2019). China (Sphaeropsis citrigena and Sphaeropsis guizhouensis), and Chile.

== Etymology ==
Sphaeropsis is derived from the New Latin from sphaer meaning sphere or globe and opsis meaning appearance, vision. So named as the species are similar in form to the fungal genus Sphaeria Haller, Hist. Stirp. Helv. 3: 120 (1768), (in the Hypoxylaceae family, Xylariales order).

== Hosts ==
Species Sphaeropsis visci causes leaf-spot disease on Asian mistletoe (Viscum coloratum (Kom.) Nakai) in China, and also on European mistletoe (Viscum album) populations. While species Sphaeropsis pinea (Needle cast) is a significant problem in Chile.

== Species ==
As of 1 September 2023, the GBIF lists up to 143 species, while Species Fungorum lists about 139 species (out of 374 records). Over 600 species were accepted by Wijayawardene et al. 2020.

This list of species with name, authority and dates is based on the Species Fungorum list.

- Sphaeropsis abietis Povah (1931)
- Sphaeropsis abietis-mariesii Sawada (1950)
- Sphaeropsis actinidiae Ablak. (1960)
- Sphaeropsis akebiae Dearn. (1924)
- Sphaeropsis alsines Gonz. Frag. (1918)
- Sphaeropsis americana Sacc. (1907)
- Sphaeropsis amplispora Dearn. & Barthol. (1926)
- Sphaeropsis arenaria Tassi (1900)
- Sphaeropsis aristolochiae Dearn. & House (1918)
- Sphaeropsis astericola H.C. Greene (1959)
- Sphaeropsis asterisci (Pat.) Zambett. (1955)
- Sphaeropsis astragali Höhn. (1905)
- Sphaeropsis begoniicola Ellis & Everh. (1902)
- Sphaeropsis berberidis S. Ahmad (1971)
- Sphaeropsis betulae Cooke (1885)
- Sphaeropsis cactinae V.G. Rao (1962)
- Sphaeropsis cadabae S. Ahmad (1971)
- Sphaeropsis calycanthi Scalia (1902)
- Sphaeropsis capparis S. Ahmad (1971)
- Sphaeropsis carthami S. Ahmad (1971)
- Sphaeropsis caryotae V.G. Rao & Narendra (1977)
- Sphaeropsis caulincola (Wallr.) Fuckel ex Petr. & Syd. (1924)
- Sphaeropsis cerasifolia McAlpine (1902)
- Sphaeropsis cereicola Speg. (1910)
- Sphaeropsis chromolaenicola Mapook & K.D. Hyde (2020)
- Sphaeropsis cinnamomi S.Q. Chen & P.K. Chi (1994)
- Sphaeropsis citrigena (A.J.L. Phillips, P.R. Johnst. & Pennycook) A.J.L. Phillips & A. Alves (2013)
- Sphaeropsis codiaei Cif. & Gonz. Frag. (1925)
- Sphaeropsis coluteae Sacc. (1914)
- Sphaeropsis conspersa (Cooke) W.A. Archer (1926)
- Sphaeropsis cordiana S. Ahmad (1971)
- Sphaeropsis cornicola Dearn. (1936)
- Sphaeropsis cryptomeriae Sawada (1950)
- Sphaeropsis cycadis Mundk. & S. Ahmad (1946)
- Sphaeropsis datiscae Sousa da Câmara (1936)
- Sphaeropsis dendranthemae P.K. Chi & F.X. Chao (1994)
- Sphaeropsis desmodiicola (Gonz. Frag.) Zambett. (1955)
- Sphaeropsis dilleniae Henn. (1902)
- Sphaeropsis dircae Ellis & Everh. (1900)
- Sphaeropsis dracaenae P.G. Xi & P.K. Chi (2000)
- Sphaeropsis eucalypticola A.J.L. Phillips (2013)
- Sphaeropsis euonymi Gabotto (1905)
- Sphaeropsis fici-elasticae Petr. (1922)
- Sphaeropsis foliicola (Berl. & Roum.) Sacc. (1913)
- Sphaeropsis fragosoana Traverso (1915)
- Sphaeropsis galii Volc. (1981)
- Sphaeropsis ginkgonis O. Săvul. & Tud.-Bǎn. (1969)
- Sphaeropsis glandulosa Cooke (1878)
- Sphaeropsis gouldiae F. Stevens & Plunkett (1925)
- Sphaeropsis graminum Scalia (1901)
- Sphaeropsis grandiflorae Ellis & Everh. (1902)
- Sphaeropsis grandinea Ellis & Everh. (1904)
- Sphaeropsis guizhouensis Ya Ya Chen, Dissan. & Jian K. Liu (2021)
- Sphaeropsis guttifera G.H. Otth (1895)
- Sphaeropsis hamamelidis Tassi (1904)
- Sphaeropsis hariotii Sacc. (1916)
- Sphaeropsis hassanii (Unamuno) Zambett. (1955)
- Sphaeropsis hedericola (Speg.) Sacc. (1884)
- Sphaeropsis heterogena Bubák (1914)
- Sphaeropsis heveae Gonz. Frag. & Cif. (1928)
- Sphaeropsis hippocastanea Gaja (1911)
- Sphaeropsis hranicensis Petr. (1921)
- Sphaeropsis hrubyi Petr. (1922)
- Sphaeropsis hyalina Berk. & M.A. Curtis (1874)
- Sphaeropsis hypodermia Höhn. (1915)
- Sphaeropsis ixorae-parviflorae N.D. Sharma (1982)
- Sphaeropsis japonica I. Miyake (1909)
- Sphaeropsis jodhpurensis Shreem. & Bilgrami (1973)
- Sphaeropsis karachiensis Abbas, B. Sutton & Ghaffar (2000)
- Sphaeropsis latispora (Peck) Dearn. (1917)
- Sphaeropsis leptadeniae S. Ahmad (1971)
- Sphaeropsis ligniperda Czerepan. (1951)
- Sphaeropsis ligustri N.F. Buchw. (1958)
- Sphaeropsis linariae (Rabenh.) Zambett. (1955)
- Sphaeropsis lineata Ellis & Dearn. (1916)
- Sphaeropsis linhaiensis X.E. Xiao, Crous & H.Y. Li (2021)
- Sphaeropsis loranthi Chona, Munjal & J.N. Kapoor (1957)
- Sphaeropsis lycii Dearn. & Barthol. (1926)
- Sphaeropsis lyndonvillae Sacc. (1906)
- Sphaeropsis magnoliae Magnaghi (1902)
- Sphaeropsis melanconioides Peck (1911)
- Sphaeropsis mespili Hollós (1910)
- Sphaeropsis mimosicola Speg. (1910)
- Sphaeropsis moelleriana Sacc. (1903)
- Sphaeropsis muehlenbeckiae Bilgrami & Shreem. (1969)
- Sphaeropsis mulinicola Speg. (1910)
- Sphaeropsis myrtaceicola Bat. & Peres (1965)
- Sphaeropsis necatrix Petri & Adami (1917)
- Sphaeropsis negundinis Tehon & E.Y. Daniels (1925)
- Sphaeropsis nubilosa Ellis & Barthol. (1900)
- Sphaeropsis oligosperma Speg. (1921)
- Sphaeropsis oncidii (Henn.) Died. (1914)
- Sphaeropsis orchidearum Cif. & Gonz. Frag. (1926)
- Sphaeropsis paeoniae Bongini (1934)
- Sphaeropsis pallidula Fairm. (1921)
- Sphaeropsis parca Berk. & Broome (1850)
- Sphaeropsis persicae Ellis & Barthol. (1902)
- Sphaeropsis philodendri X.H. Zheng & P.K. Chi (2000)
- Sphaeropsis phoenicis J.V. Almeida & Sousa da Câmara (1906)
- Sphaeropsis photiniae Traverso & Migliardi (1911)
- Sphaeropsis pilocarpi Tassi (1901)
- Sphaeropsis pinicola Speg. (1910)
- Sphaeropsis plumeriae S.M. Singh (1979)
- Sphaeropsis polianthina S. Ahmad (1961)
- Sphaeropsis ponciri Teng (1932)
- Sphaeropsis porosa (Van Niekerk & Crous) A.J.L. Phillips & A. Alves (2013)
- Sphaeropsis profundae Tehon & E.Y. Daniels (1927)
- Sphaeropsis ptilotrichi Unamuno (1942)
- Sphaeropsis punctata Dearn. & House (1918)
- Sphaeropsis punicae Shreem. & Bilgrami (1973)
- Sphaeropsis puttemansii Henn. (1908)
- Sphaeropsis ralfsii Berk. & Broome (1850)
- Sphaeropsis raphiae Tassi (1901)
- Sphaeropsis rehmanniae F.X. Chao & P.K. Chi (1994)
- Sphaeropsis rhodocarpa Fairm. (1913)
- Sphaeropsis rutae Höhn. (1925)
- Sphaeropsis sabalicola Ellis & Carver (1902)
- Sphaeropsis salicis Ellis & Barthol. (1902)
- Sphaeropsis salviae Hollós (1906)
- Sphaeropsis sapinea (Fr.) Dyko & B. Sutton (1980)
- Sphaeropsis saponariae Roum. ex Petr. & Syd. (1926)
- Sphaeropsis sarmientoi Speg. (1910)
- Sphaeropsis sideritis Gonz. Frag. (1916)
- Sphaeropsis solieri (Mont.) E. Gallego & Pedreño (1986)
- Sphaeropsis spartii Bubák (1906)
- Sphaeropsis spinulosa (Henn.) Zambett. (1955)
- Sphaeropsis sterculiae Tassi (1901)
- Sphaeropsis stictoides Earle (1902)
- Sphaeropsis sumachi (Schwein.) Cooke & Ellis (1876)
- Sphaeropsis teucrii Volc. (1981)
- Sphaeropsis tulipastri House (1918)
- Sphaeropsis vaccinii W.B. Cooke & C.G. Shaw (1952)
- Sphaeropsis valentina Caball. (1941)
- Sphaeropsis veronicae Wehm. (1964)
- Sphaeropsis verrucosa I. Hino & Katum. (1961)
- Sphaeropsis viridula Tassi (1900)
- Sphaeropsis viscicola Sawada (1958)
- Sphaeropsis vochysiae Peres & J.L. Bezerra (1982)
- Sphaeropsis wisteriana Fairm. (1918)

=== Former species ===
Many older species of Sphaeropsis have been transferred to other genera. Such as Sphaeropsis malorum (Berk.) Berk. (1860), is now Botryosphaeria stevensii Shoemaker, (1964). Aklso Sphaeropsis tumefaciens Hedges (1911) now Cophinforma tumefaciens. Sphaeropsis pyriputrescens C.L. Xiao & J.D. Rogers (2004) (Sphaeropsis Apple rot), now Xenosphaeropsis pyriputrescens (in the Phacidiaceae family).
