= Phomatosphaeropsis =

Scientific classification
- Kingdom: Fungi
- Division: Ascomycota
- Class: Dothideomycetes
- Order: Botryosphaeriales
- Family: Botryosphaeriaceae
- Genus: Phomatosphaeropsis; Ribaldi 1953

Species
- Phomatosphaeropsis pinicola

Genus of fungi

Phomatosphaeropsis is a genus of fungi in the family Botryosphaeriaceae containing the single species Phomatosphaeropsis pinicola.
