= Neodeightonia phoenicum =

Scientific classification
- Kingdom: Fungi
- Division: Ascomycota
- Class: Dothideomycetes
- Order: Botryosphaeriales
- Family: Botryosphaeriaceae
- Genus: Neodeightonia
- Species: N. phoenicum

Binomial name
- Neodeightonia phoenicum A.J.L. Phillips & Crous (2008)

Synonyms
- Diplodia phoenicum (Sacc.) H.S. Fawc. & Klotz, (1932); Macrophoma phoenicum Sacc., (1890); Strionemadiplodia phoenicum (Sacc.) Zambett., (1955)

Species of fungus

Neodeightonia phoenicum is a plant pathogen.
