= Phaeobotryosphaeria =

Scientific classification
- Kingdom: Fungi
- Division: Ascomycota
- Class: Dothideomycetes
- Order: Botryosphaeriales
- Family: Botryosphaeriaceae
- Genus: Phaeobotryosphaeria; Speg. 1908

Species
- See text.

Genus of fungi

Phaeobotryosphaeria is a genus of fungi in the family Botryosphaeriaceae. There were originally 10 species.

Then genus Sphaeropsis was found to be the asexual morph of Phaeobotryosphaeria.

== Species ==
As accepted by Species Fungorum;

- Phaeobotryosphaeria chrysites Rick (1933)
- Phaeobotryosphaeria hypoxyloides Rick (1933)
- Phaeobotryosphaeria leonensis Petr. (1952)
- Phaeobotryosphaeria thomesiana Sacc. (1922)
- Phaeobotryosphaeria yerbae Speg. (1908)

Former species (all Botryosphaeriaceae family); andromedae(Auersw.) M.E. Barr (1959)Extrawettsteinina andromedae Pleosporaceae

- P. citrigena A.J.L. Phillips, P.R. Johnst. & Pennycook (2008) = Sphaeropsis citrigena
- P. eucalypti Doilom, Jian K. Liu & K.D. Hyde (2012) = Sphaeropsis eucalypticola
- P. fusca (N.E. Stevens) Petr. (1952) = Botryosphaeria disrupta
- P. plicatula (Berk. & Broome) Petch (1917) = Botryosphaeria plicatula
- P. porosa (Van Niekerk & Crous) Crous & A.J.L. Phillips (2008) = Sphaeropsis porosa
- P. visci (Kalchbr.) A.J.L. Phillips & Crous (2008) = Botryosphaeria visci
