= Fusicoccum =

Scientific classification
- Kingdom: Fungi
- Division: Ascomycota
- Class: Dothideomycetes
- Order: Botryosphaeriales
- Family: Botryosphaeriaceae
- Genus: Fusicoccum; Corda (1829)

Type species
- Fusicoccum aesculi Corda (1829)

Species
- See text.

Synonyms
- Polythecium Bonord. (1861)

Genus of fungi

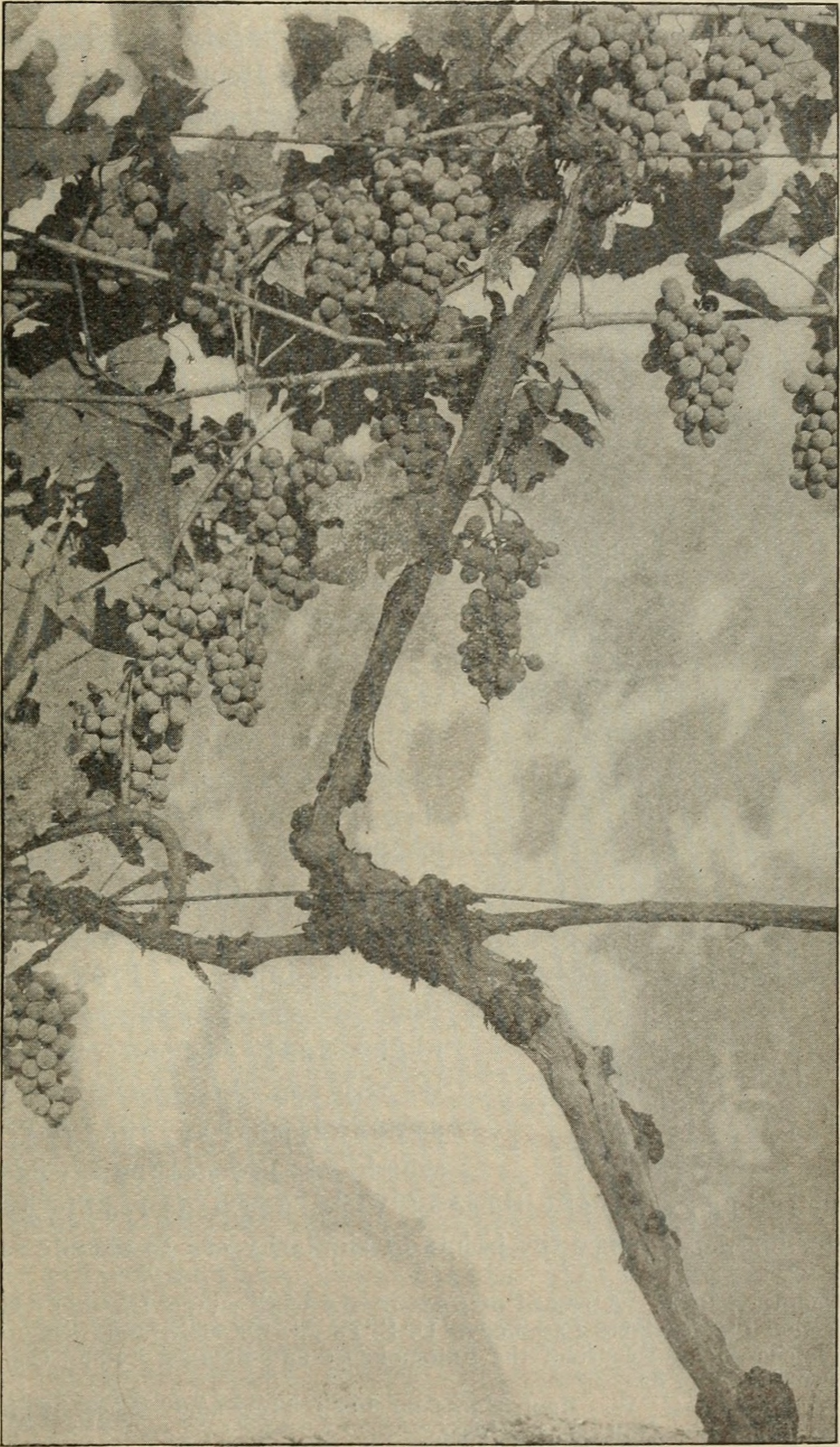
The Fusicoccum fungus on a grape vine, 1908

Fusicoccum is a genus of anamorphic fungi in the family Botryosphaeriaceae. There are over 90 species.

== Species ==
- F. abietis
- F. acaciae
- F. aceris
- F. advenum
- F. aesculanum
- F.aesculi
- F. africanum
- F. albiziae
- F. album
- F. alni
- F. alnicola
- F. alocasiae
- F. amygdali
- F. amygdalinum
- F. araucariae
- F. asparagi
- F. asperum
- F. aucupariae
- F. betulae
- F. betulinum
- F. brunaudii
- F. cacti
- F. cactorum
- F. caraganae
- F. carpini
- F. cedrelae
- F. cheiranthi
- F. cinctum
- F. coluteae
- F. complanatum
- F. corni
- F. cornicola
- F. coronatum
- F. corylinum
- F. corynocarpi
- F. costesii
- F. cryptomeriae
- F. cryptosporioides
- F. dakotense
- F. daphneorum
- F. depressum
- F. dipsaci
- F. elaeagni
- F. elasticae
- F. elasticum
- F. ellisii
- F. ericeti
- F. eumorphum
- F. euphorbiae
- F. farlowianum
- F. fibrosum
- F. forsythiae
- F. fraxini
- F. gibberelloide
- F. gloeosporioides
- F. guttulatum
- F. hapalocystis
- F. hippocastani
- F. homostegium
- F. hoveniae
- F. hranicense
- F. ilicellum
- F. ilicinum
- F. indicum
- F. jasminicola
- F. jatrophae
- F. juglandinum
- F. juglandis
- F. juniperi
- F. kunzeanum
- F. lahoreanum
- F. lanceolatum
- F. lesourdeanum
- F. leucostomum
- F. leucothoës
- F. ligustri
- F. liriodendri
- F. macalpinei
- F. macarangae
- F. macrosporum
- F. maesae
- F. malorum
- F. marconii
- F. microspermum
- F. microsporum
- F. moravicum
- F. myricae
- F. myrtillinum
- F. nervicola
- F. noxium
- F. obtusulum
- F. operculatum
- F. ornellum
- F. oxalidicola
- F. perniciosum
- F. persicae
- F. petiolicola
- F. petrakianum
- F. petrakii
- F. phomiformis
- F. pini
- F. pithyum
- F. pittospori
- F. populi
- F. populinum
- F. proteae
- F. pruni
- F. pseudacaciae
- F. pulvinatum
- F. putrefaciens
- F. pyrolae
- F. pyrorum
- F. quercus
- F. ramosum
- F. rimosum
- F. rosae
- F. rubrum
- F. saccardoanum
- F. sambucicola
- F. sapoticola
- F. sardoa
- F. schulzeri
- F. smilacinum
- F. smilacis
- F. sorbi
- F. sordescens
- F. spiraeae
- F. syringae
- F. syringicola
- F. tanaense
- F. testudo
- F. tiliae
- F. turconii
- F. ubrizsyi
- F. ulmi
- F. umbrinum
- F. veronense
- F. viridulum
- F. yuccigena
- F. zanthoxyli
