= Dothidotthia =

Scientific classification
- Kingdom: Fungi
- Division: Ascomycota
- Class: Dothideomycetes
- Order: Botryosphaeriales
- Family: Botryosphaeriaceae
- Genus: Dothidotthia; Höhn.

Species
- See text.

Genus of fungi

Dothidotthia is a genus of fungi in the family Botryosphaeriaceae. There are 11 species.

== Species ==
- Dothidotthia andersonii
- Dothidotthia aspera
- Dothidotthia celtidis
- Dothidotthia diapensiae
- Dothidotthia fruticola
- Dothidotthia lasioderma
- Dothidotthia melanococca
- Dothidotthia quercicola
- Dothidotthia ramulicola
- Dothidotthia scabra
- Dothidotthia symphoricarpi
