= Lasiodiplodia gilanensis =

Scientific classification
- Kingdom: Fungi
- Division: Ascomycota
- Class: Dothideomycetes
- Order: Botryosphaeriales
- Family: Botryosphaeriaceae
- Genus: Lasiodiplodia
- Species: L. gilanensis

Binomial name
- Lasiodiplodia gilanensis Abdollahzadeh et al., 2010

Species of fungus

Lasiodiplodia gilanensis is an endophytic fungus. It was first isolated in Gilan Province, Iran, hence its name. It has since been isolated in other plants in other continents, and is considered a plant pathogen. L. gilanensis is phylogenetically related to L. plurivora, but can be distinguished by its conidial dimensions. Also, the paraphyses of the former are up to 95μm long and 4μm wide, whereas those of L. plurivora are up to 130μm long and 10μm wide. At the same time, the basal 1–3 cells in the paraphyses of L. plurivora are broader than its apical cells.

== Description ==
Its conidiomata are stromatic and pycnidial; its mycelium being uniloculate and non-papillate, with a central ostiole. Paraphyses are hyaline and cylindrical. Conidiophores are absent in this species. Its conidiogenous cells are holoblastic and also hyaline, while its conidia are aseptate and ellipsoid.
