= Granulodiplodia =

Scientific classification
- Kingdom: Fungi
- Division: Ascomycota
- Class: Dothideomycetes
- Order: Botryosphaeriales
- Family: Botryosphaeriaceae
- Genus: Granulodiplodia; Zambett. ex M.Morelet (1973)

Species
- See text.

Genus of fungi

Granulodiplodia is a genus of fungi in the family Botryosphaeriaceae. There are six species.

== Species ==
- Granulodiplodia abnormis
- Granulodiplodia adelinensis
- Granulodiplodia granulosa
- Granulodiplodia granulosella
- Granulodiplodia megalospora
- Granulodiplodia stangeriae
