= Fusicoccum quercus =

Scientific classification
- Kingdom: Fungi
- Division: Ascomycota
- Class: Dothideomycetes
- Order: Botryosphaeriales
- Family: Botryosphaeriaceae
- Genus: Fusicoccum
- Species: F. quercus

Binomial name
- Fusicoccum quercus Oudem. (1894)

Species of fungus

Fusicoccum quercus is a species of anamorphic fungus in the family Botryosphaeriaceae. It causes a bark canker that occurs on oak trees (Quercus). It is an aggressive, widespread bark parasite on saplings, young trees and on branches of older trees of many oaks. The symptoms are a 0.5–3 mm-long elliptic coloured spot that appears at the base of the branches, followed by necrosis that grows around the branch at this spot, causing the branch and shoots to die.

The disease is only spread by big alpha or small beta conidia that grow from the phomopsis type (pycnidia) in the summer, and from the fusicoccum type winterhidings in September. It occurs mainly in dry (arid) habitats.
