= Fusicoccum aesculi =

Scientific classification
- Kingdom: Fungi
- Division: Ascomycota
- Class: Dothideomycetes
- Order: Botryosphaeriales
- Family: Botryosphaeriaceae
- Genus: Fusicoccum
- Species: F. aesculi

Binomial name
- Fusicoccum aesculi Corda

Species of fungus

Fusicoccum aesculi is a fungus and a plant pathogen.
