= Lasiodiplodia iraniensis =

Scientific classification
- Kingdom: Fungi
- Division: Ascomycota
- Class: Dothideomycetes
- Order: Botryosphaeriales
- Family: Botryosphaeriaceae
- Genus: Lasiodiplodia
- Species: L. iraniensis

Binomial name
- Lasiodiplodia iraniensis Abdollahzadeh et al., 2010

Species of fungus

Lasiodiplodia iraniensis is a species of endophytic fungus. It was first isolated in Mangifera indica, Eucalyptus and citrus species, Salvadora persica, Juglans species and Terminalia catapa in Iran. It has since been isolated in other plants in other continents, and is considered a plant pathogen.
