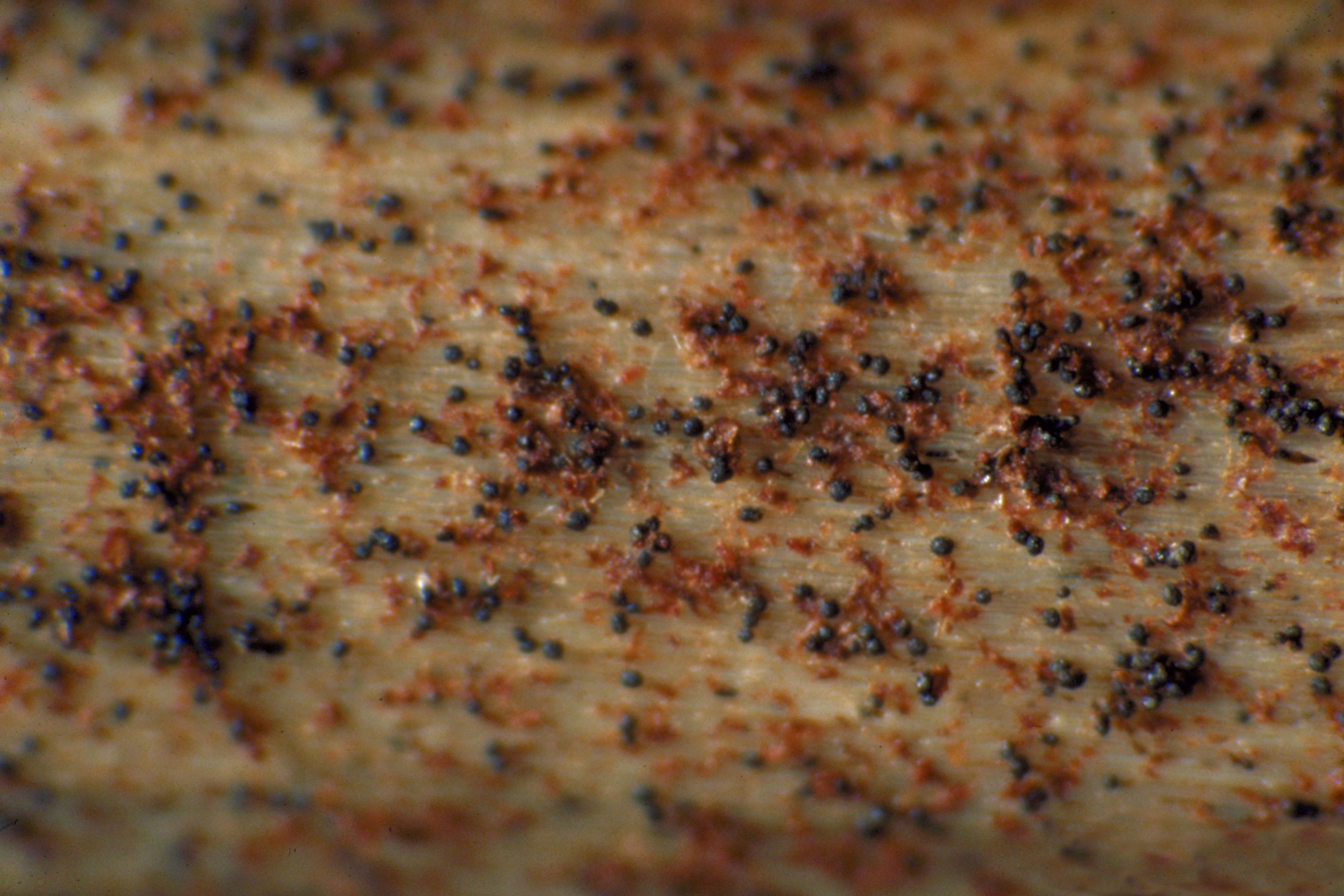
- Macrophomina phaseolina spores growing on Pinus

Scientific classification
- Kingdom: Fungi
- Division: Ascomycota
- Class: Dothideomycetes
- Order: Botryosphaeriales
- Family: Botryosphaeriaceae
- Genus: Macrophomina
- Species: M. phaseolina

Binomial name
- Macrophomina phaseolina (Tassi) Goid. (1947)

Synonyms
- Botryodiplodia phaseoli (Maubl.) Thirum. (1953); Dothiorella cajani (Syd., P.Syd. & E.J.Butler) Syd., P.Syd. & E.J.Butler (1925); Dothiorella phaseoli (Maubl.) Petr. & Syd. (1927); Dothiorella philippinensis (Petr.) Petr. (1927); Fusicoccum cajani (Syd., P.Syd. & E.J.Butler) Samuels & B.B.Singh (1986); Macrophoma cajani Syd., P.Syd. & E.J.Butler (1916); Macrophoma corchori Sawada (1916); Macrophoma phaseoli Maubl. (1905); Macrophoma phaseolina Tassi(1901); Macrophoma sesami Sawada (1922); Macrophomina phaseoli (Maubl.) S.F.Ashby, (1927); Macrophomina philippinensis Petr. (1923); Rhizoctonia bataticola (Taubenh.) E.J.Butler, (1925); Rhizoctonia lamellifera W.Small (1924); Sclerotium bataticola Taubenh. (1913); Tiarosporella phaseoli (Maubl.) Aa (1977); Tiarosporella phaseolina (Tassi) Aa (1981)

= Macrophomina phaseolina =

Species of fungus

Macrophomina phaseolina is a Botryosphaeriaceae plant pathogen fungus that causes damping off, seedling blight, collar rot, stem rot, charcoal rot, basal stem rot, and root rot on many plant species.

== Hosts, symptoms, and signs ==
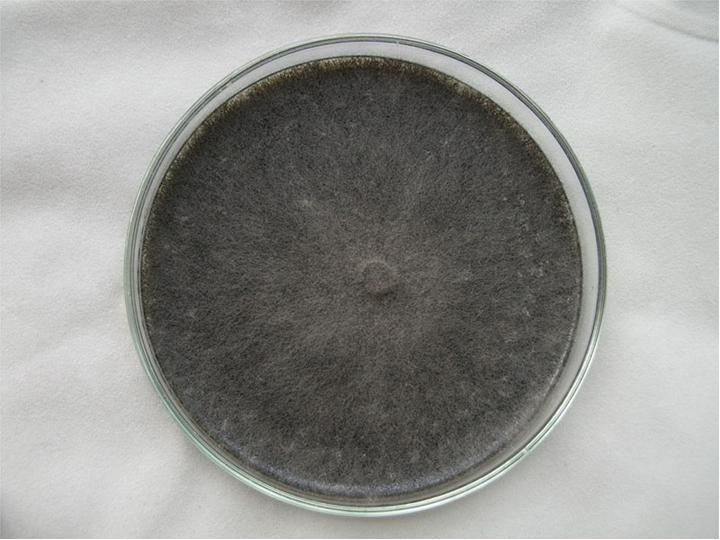
Culture of Macrophomina phaseolina on a PDA plate. Source: Photchana Trakunsukharat, Department of Agriculture, Thailand.

One of the most harmful seed and soil borne pathogens, Macrophomina phaseolina is a fungus that infects nearly 500 plant species in more than 100 families. The hosts include: peanut, cabbage, pepper, chickpea, soybean, sunflower, sweet potato, alfalfa, sesame, potato, sorghum, wheat, and corn, among others. The identification of isolates of M. phaseolina is usually based on morphology and efforts to divide the pathogen into subspecies, but because there are wide intraspecific variations in the phenotype of the isolates, these criteria are often not reliable. The failure to correctly detect and identify M. phaseolina using conventional culture-based morphological techniques has led scientists to develop nucleic acid-based molecular approaches, such as highly sensitive and specific polymerase chain reaction-based methods. Researchers have also recently created species-specific oligonucleotide primers and digoxigenin-labeled probes in hopes of better identifying and detecting M. phaseolina.

The pathogen M. phaseolina affects the fibrovascular system of the roots and basal internodes of its host, impeding the transport of water and nutrients to the upper parts of the plant. As a result, progressive wilting, premature dying, loss of vigor, and reduced yield are characteristic symptoms of M. phaseolina infection. The fungus also causes many diseases like damping off, seedling blight, collar rot, stem rot, charcoal rot, basal stem rot, and root rot. Although brown lesions may form on the hypocotyls or emerging seedlings, many symptoms occur during or after flowering, including grey discoloration of the stem and taproots, shredding of plant tissue in the stem and top of the taproot, and hollowing of the stem. Small black dots may form beneath the epidermis of the lower stem and in the taproot, giving the stems and roots a charcoal-sprinkled appearance. When the epidermis is removed, small and black microsclerotia (a sign of the disease) may be so numerous that they give a greyish-black tint to the plant tissue. In addition, reddish-brown discoloration and black streaks can form in the pith and vascular tissues of the root and stem.

== Disease cycle ==
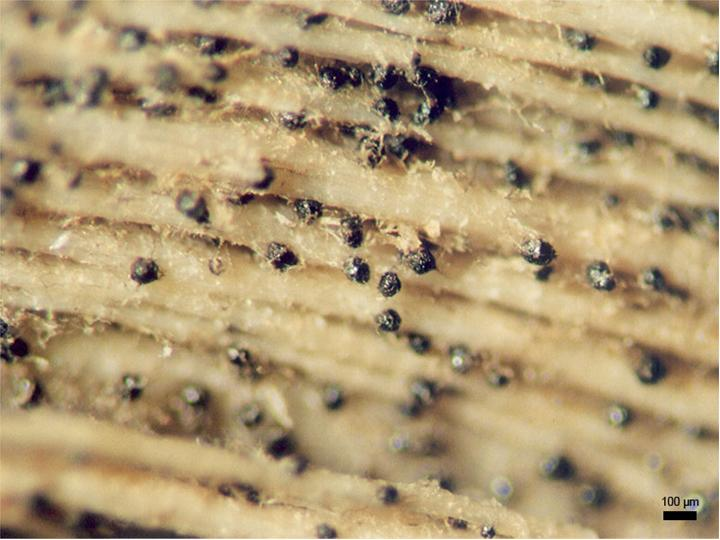
Pycnidia and sclerotia of Macrophomina phaseolina on mung bean. Source: Photchana Trakunsukharat, Department of Agriculture, Thailand.

Macrophomina phaseolina has a monocyclic disease cycle.

=== Survival ===
The M. phaseolina fungus has aggregates of hyphal cells, which form microsclerotia within the taproots and stems of the host plants. The microsclerotia overwinter in the soil and crop residue and are the primary source of inoculum in the spring. They have been shown to survive in the soil for up to three years. They are black, spherical or oblong structures that allow the persistence of the fungus under poor conditions, such as low soil nutrient levels and temperatures above 30 C. However, in wet soils, microsclerotia survival is significantly lower, often surviving no more than 7 to 8 weeks, and mycelium cannot survive more than 7 days. Additionally, infected seeds can carry the fungus in their seed coats. These infected seeds either do not germinate or produce seedlings that die soon after emergence.

=== Infection ===
Macrophomina phaseolina is a heat- and drought-favoring disease, producing large quantities of microsclerotia under relatively low water potentials and relatively high temperatures. In soybeans especially, charcoal rot typically occurs when the plants are experiencing significant drought stress.

When conditions are favorable, hyphae germinate from these microsclerotia. Germination of the microsclerotia occurs throughout the growing season when temperatures are between 28 and 35 C. Microsclerotia germinate on the roots' surface, and germ tubes on the end of the microsclerotia form appresoria that penetrate the hosts' epidermal cell walls using turgor pressure or through natural openings.

The hyphae infect the roots of the host plant. Initially, the hyphae enter the cortical tissue and grow intercellularly, then infect the roots and the vascular tissue. Within the vascular tissue, mycelia and sclerotia are produced and plug the vessels. This causes the greyish-black color often observed in plants infected by M. phaseolina, and it also prevents water and nutrients from being transported from the roots to the upper parts of the plant. Thus, due to this systemic infection, diseased plants often wilt and die prematurely.

== Management ==
Understanding the monocyclic disease cycle of M. phaseolina can help plant pathologists better understand the pathogen itself, it can help horticulturalists develop disease-resistant crops, and it can help farmers understand at what point during the growing cycle to apply fungicides or implement other management techniques.

There are several techniques currently used to manage M. phaseolina fungal infections. Often, fungicides are used to inhibit mycelial growth. These include thiram, iprodione, carbendazim, pyraclostrobin, fluquinconazol, tolyfluanid, and metalaxyl and penflufen + trifloxystrobin. The active ingredients carbendazim and penflufen + trifloxystrobin were shown to be the most powerful to control M. phaseolina. In this same study, the M. phaseolina isolate showed insensitivity to the active ingredients fluquinconazole, metalaxyl, thiram and tolyfluanid. Thus, fungicides are not necessarily an effective way to manage this fungal pathogen.

However, there are alternatives to fungicides that are especially preferred by organic farmers, such as a combination of soil solarization and organic amendment. Soil solarization is a method of using solar power for controlling pathogens in the soil by mulching the soil and covering it with a large, usually transparent polyethylene tarp to trap solar energy and heat the soil. In studies, this method has proven to be as effective as fungicides. Additionally, crop rotation can be an effective management practice. According to researchers, "Rotation out of soybeans for three years may effectively reduce microsclerotia numbers and is useful for managing charcoal rot" because "corn is not as good of a host to M. phaseolina as soybean so rotation with corn for three years may help reduce populations but not eliminate the pathogen from the soil." Finally, tillage practices can reduce moisture in the soil and make the environment less favorable for the pathogen.

== Human infection ==
This organism has been reported to cause infection in humans, particularly in immunosuppressed patients. The infection may present as a cutaneous cellulitis or as an ocular keratitis.
