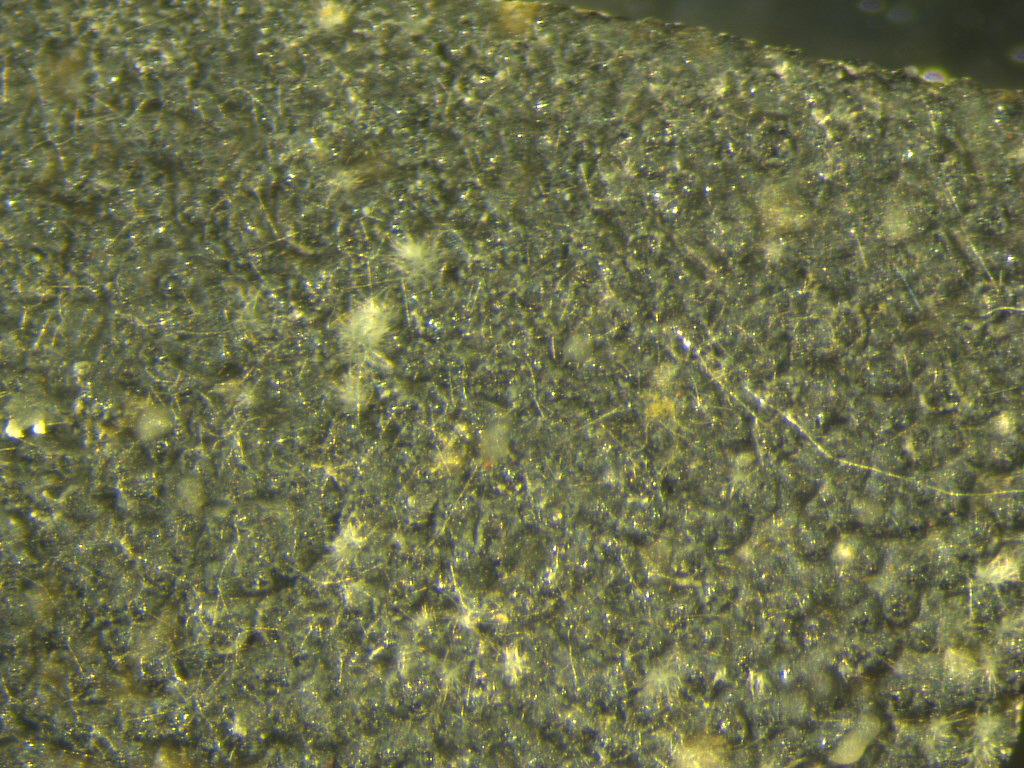
- Lasiodiplodia theobromae sporulating in lesion on papaya

Scientific classification
- Kingdom: Fungi
- Division: Ascomycota
- Class: Dothideomycetes
- Order: Botryosphaeriales
- Family: Botryosphaeriaceae
- Genus: Lasiodiplodia
- Species: L. theobromae

Binomial name
- Lasiodiplodia theobromae (Pat.) Griffon & Maubl.

Synonyms
- Botryodiplodia ananassae Botryodiplodia elasticae Botryodiplodia theobromae Botryodiplodia tubericola Botryosphaeria rhodina (Berk. and Curtis) Arx; Chaetodiplodia grisea Diplodia ananassae Diplodia gossypina Cooke; Diplodia theobromae Diplodia tubericola Lasiodiplodia nigra Lasiodiplodia triflorae Lasiodiplodia tubericola Lasiodiplodiella triflorae Macrophoma vestita

= Lasiodiplodia theobromae =

Species of fungus

Lasiodiplodia theobromae is a plant pathogen with a very wide host range. It causes rotting and dieback in most species it infects. It is a common postharvest fungus disease of citrus known as stem-end rot. It is a cause of bot canker of grapevine. It also infects Biancaea sappan, a species of flowering tree also known as Sappanwood.

On rare occasions it has been found to cause fungal keratitis, lesions on nail and subcutaneous tissue.

It has been implicated in the widespread mortality of baobab (Adansonia digitata) trees in Southern Africa. A preliminary study found the deaths to have a complex set of causes requiring detailed research.

== Host and symptoms ==
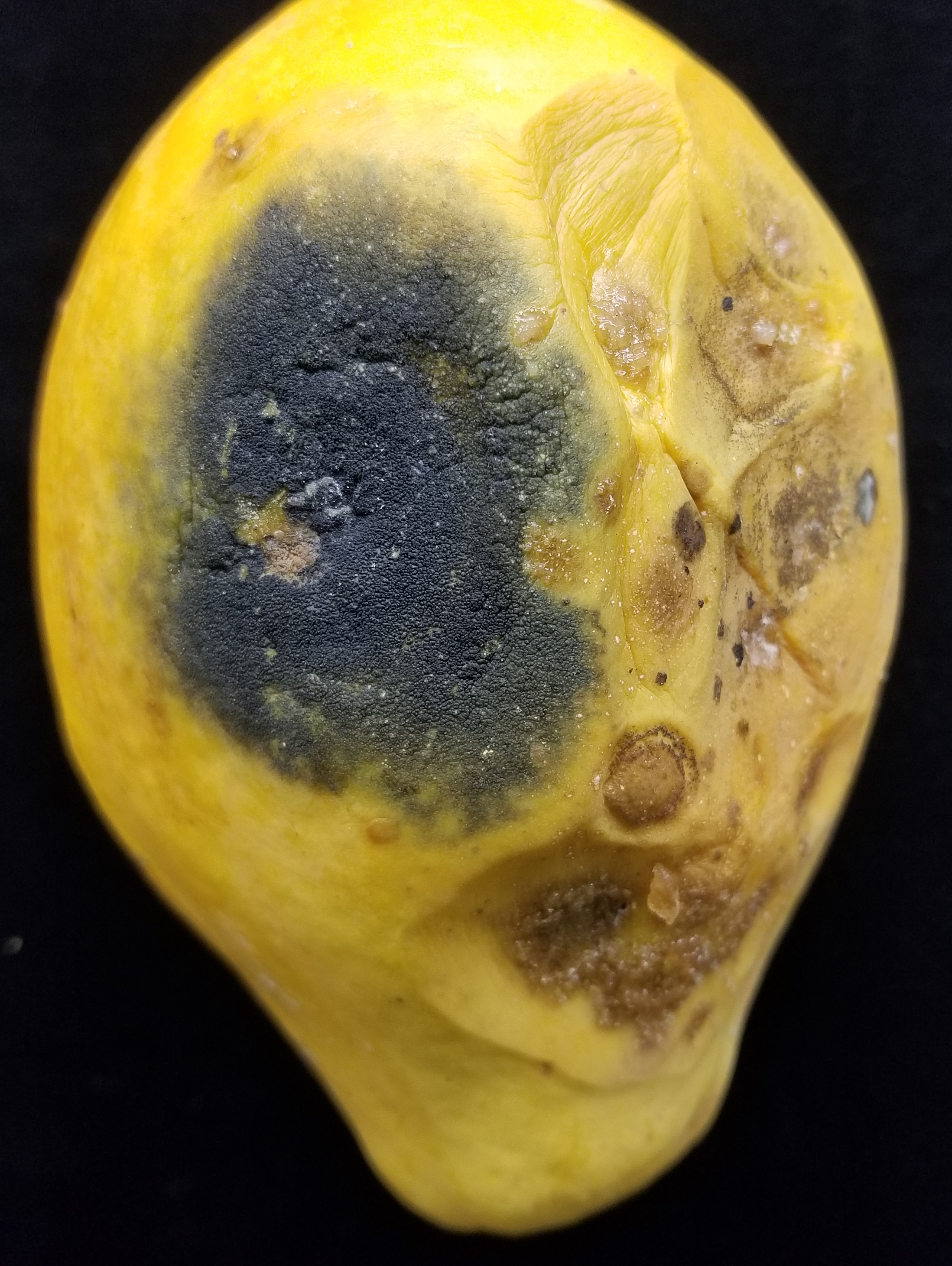
Lasiodiplodia fruit rot on Carica papaya

L. theobromae causes diseases such as dieback, blights, and root rot in a variety of different hosts in tropical and subtropical regions. These include guava, coconut, papaya, and grapevine. Botryosphaeria dieback, which is formerly known as bot canker, is characterised by a range of symptoms that affect grapevine in particular. These symptoms affect different areas on the plant and can be used to diagnose this disease along with other factors. In the trunk and cordon of the plant, symptoms include cankers coming out of the wounds, wedge shaped lesions when cut in cross sections and dieback. Dieback is characterised as a "dead arm" and a loss of spur positions. More symptoms include stunted shoots in the spring, delay or lack of growth in the spur positions of the bud burst, bleached canes and necrotic buds. Bud necrosis, bud failure, and the dieback of arms are all a result of the necrosis of the host's vascular system.

It can also affect the fruit of durians such as Durio graveolens.

== Disease cycle ==
The fungus over-winters as pycnidia on the outside of diseased wood. The pycnidia produce and release dark brown, striated conidia. The conidia are then dispersed by wind or rain-splash, spreading the fungi from one part of the vine to another, and to other nearby vines. Disease develops when conidia land on freshly cut or damaged wood; the conidia germinate in the wood tissue, progressively damaging the host-plant's vascular system. As tissue damage advances around the initial site of infection, the formation of cankers and cell death—or necrosis—will cause eventual dieback of the wood.

Under certain conditions, pseudothecia will grow on the surface of cankers and produce ascospores, which—like conidia—will disperse to infect surrounding wounds.

== Management ==
Several procedures can be implemented to manage dieback in a vineyard; either to break the disease cycle and prevent further infection or to help plants recover after initial infection. When removing infected material, good hygiene —i.e., the use of PPE and decontamination processes—must be practiced in order to avoid cross-contamination and prevent further spread of the infection to unaffected vines.

Strategies used for prevention and recovery are listed in the table below:

Aim	Strategy	Method
Prevention	Cultural Practices	Avoid pruning during wet weather (spores of Botryosphaeriaceae fungi are released up to 2 hours after rain); Minimise number and size of pruning wounds; Cuts should be made at an angle to allow water to drain from the wood surfaces; Prune early in the season when spore production is low or late in the season when wounds are less susceptible and heal more rapidly
Prevention	Chemical Practices Protection of pruning wounds is the most efficient and cost effective way to prevent grapevine trunk diseases.	Pruning wound protection: apply fungicides, paints, pastes or biological control agents directly onto large cuts as soon as possible after pruning; Vinevax™ (biological control agent) and Greenseal™ are the only two products registered in Australia for pruning wound protection (both products are registered for the control of eutypa dieback)
Management	Removal of Infected Wood	Remove dead wood of cordons and 10 cm of healthy tissue; Extensively rework infected crown or trunk; Remove all infected wood from the vineyard; Retrain new cordons; Replace trunk with water shoots
