= Leptodothiorella =

Scientific classification
- Kingdom: Fungi
- Division: Ascomycota
- Class: Dothideomycetes
- Order: Botryosphaeriales
- Family: Botryosphaeriaceae
- Genus: Leptodothiorella

Species
- See text

Genus of fungi

Lasiodothiorella is a genus of fungi in the family Botryosphaeriaceae. There are 15 species.

== Species ==
- Lasiodothiorella advena
- Lasiodothiorella berengeriana
- Lasiodothiorella capparis
- Lasiodothiorella cisti
- Lasiodothiorella concinna
- Lasiodothiorella creberrima
- Lasiodothiorella crotonicola
- Lasiodothiorella cyanthea
- Lasiodothiorella ficicola
- Lasiodothiorella glycosmidis
- Lasiodothiorella indica
- Lasiodothiorella marconii
- Lasiodothiorella notabilis
- Lasiodothiorella pachmarhiensis
- Lasiodothiorella serjaniae
