= Discochora =

Scientific classification
- Kingdom: Fungi
- Division: Ascomycota
- Class: Dothideomycetes
- Order: Botryosphaeriales
- Family: Botryosphaeriaceae
- Genus: Discochora; Höhn. 1918

Species
- See text.

Genus of fungi

Discochora is a genus of fungi in the family Botryosphaeriaceae. There are 9 species.

== Species ==
- Discochora aphyllanthis
- Discochora asparagi
- Discochora dianellicola
- Discochora dracaenae
- Discochora pini
- Discochora smilacinina
- Discochora smilacis
- Discochora tofieldiae
- Discochora yuccae
