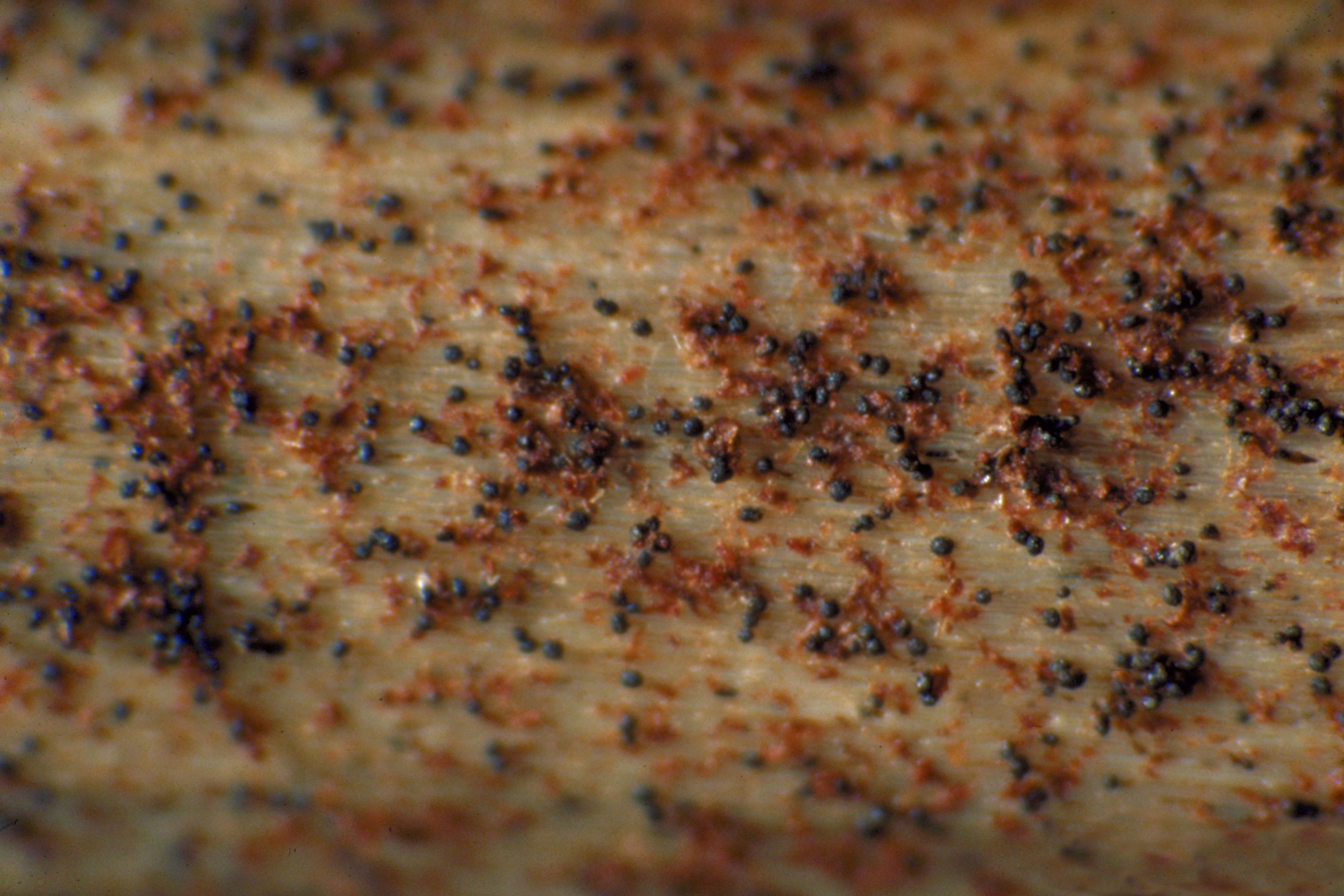
- Black microsclerotia and orange pycnidia of Macrophomina phaseolina infecting Pinus elliottii

Scientific classification
- Kingdom: Fungi
- Division: Ascomycota
- Class: Dothideomycetes
- Order: Botryosphaeriales
- Family: Botryosphaeriaceae
- Genus: Macrophomina; Petr. 1923

Type species
- M. phaseolina (Tassi) Goid. 1947

Species
- Macrophomina euphorbiicola; Macrophomina phaseolina; Macrophomina pseudophaseolina; Macrophomina tecta; Macrophomina vaccinii

= Macrophomina =

Genus of fungi

Macrophomina is a genus of plant pathogens in the fungus family Botryosphaeriaceae, originally described by Franz Petrak in 1923. It contains at least 5 species.

The type species was originally called M. philippinensis, but its current name is Macrophomina phaseolina; it causes charcoal rot disease on many diverse plant species. The former species Macrophomina limbalis has been renamed to Dothiorella limbalis.
