= Barriopsis =

Scientific classification
- Kingdom: Fungi
- Division: Ascomycota
- Class: Dothideomycetes
- Order: Botryosphaeriales
- Family: Botryosphaeriaceae
- Genus: Barriopsis; A.J.L. Phillips, A. Alves & Crous, 2008

Species
- Barriopsis archontophoenicis; Barriopsis fusca; Barriopsis iraniana; Barriopsis stevensiana; Barriopsis tectonae; Barriopsis thailandica

Genus of fungi

Barriopsis is genus of fungus first described in 2008.
