= Auerswaldiella =

Scientific classification
- Kingdom: Fungi
- Division: Ascomycota
- Class: Dothideomycetes
- Order: Botryosphaeriales
- Family: incertae sedis
- Genus: Auerswaldiella Theiss. & Syd. (1914)

Type species
- Auerswaldiella puccinioides (Speg.) Theiss. & Syd. (1914)

Genus of fungi

Auerswaldiella is a genus of fungi in the family Botryosphaeriaceae. According to the Dictionary of the Fungi, there are four species, widespread in tropical regions.

== Species ==
- Auerswaldiella amapaeasis Bat. & H. Maia 1966
- Auerswaldiella lithocarpicola Sivan. & W.H. Hsieh 1989
- Auerswaldiella nervisequens Chardón ex Arx & E. Müll. 1954
- Auerswaldiella novoguineensis Otani 1973
- Auerswaldiella ocoteae Bat. 1954
- Auerswaldiella parvispora M.L. Farr 1989
- Auerswaldiella puccinioides (Speg.) Theiss. & Syd. 1914
- Auerswaldiella winteri Arx & E. Müll. 1954
