= Lasiodiplodia citricola =

Scientific classification
- Kingdom: Fungi
- Division: Ascomycota
- Class: Dothideomycetes
- Order: Botryosphaeriales
- Family: Botryosphaeriaceae
- Genus: Lasiodiplodia
- Species: L. citricola

Binomial name
- Lasiodiplodia citricola Abdollahzadeh et al., 2010

Species of fungus

Lasiodiplodia citricola is an endophytic fungus. It was first isolated in northern Iran, and is named after its first known host, citrus plants. It has since been isolated in other plants in other continents, and is considered a plant pathogen. L. citricola is phylogenetically related to L. parva, but conidia of the former are longer and wider.

== Description ==
Its conidiomata are stromatic and pycnidial; mycelium is uniloculate, up to 2 millimetres (0.079 in) in diameter, non-papillate and with a central ostiole. Its paraphyses are hyaline, cylindrical and thin-walled. Conidiophores are absent in this species. Conidiogenous cells are holoblastic and also hyaline. Conidia are aseptate, ellipsoid to ovoid and with longitudinal striations.
