= Leptoguignardia =

Scientific classification
- Kingdom: Fungi
- Division: Ascomycota
- Class: Dothideomycetes
- Order: Botryosphaeriales
- Family: Botryosphaeriaceae
- Genus: Leptoguignardia; E. Müll.

Species
- Leptoguignardia onobrychidis E. Müll. 1955

Genus of fungi

Leptoguignardia is a genus of fungi in the family Botryosphaeriaceae. It contains the single species Leptoguignardia onobrychidis.
