= Lasiodiplodia =

Scientific classification
- Kingdom: Fungi
- Division: Ascomycota
- Class: Dothideomycetes
- Order: Botryosphaeriales
- Family: Botryosphaeriaceae
- Genus: Lasiodiplodia; Ellis & Everh. (1896)

Type species
- Lasiodiplodia tubericola

Species
- See text

Synonyms
- Combodia Fr. (1849); Striodiplodia Zambett. (1955)

Genus of fungi

Lasiodiplodia is a genus of fungi in the family Botryosphaeriaceae. There were about 21 species. Lasiodiplodia, commonly referred to as black-soot disease, is a significant pathogen in tropical forestry.

== Species ==
As accepted by Species Fungorum;

- Lasiodiplodia americana S.F. Chen, G.Q. Li & Michailides (2015)
- Lasiodiplodia aquilariae Y. Zhang ter & S. Lin (2019)
- Lasiodiplodia avicenniae J.A. Osorio, Jol. Roux & Z.W. de Beer (2016)
- Lasiodiplodia avicenniarum Jayasiri, E.B.G. Jones & K.D. Hyde (2019)
- Lasiodiplodia brasiliensis M.S.B. Netto, M.W. Marques & A.J.L. Phillips (2014)
- Lasiodiplodia bruguierae J.A. Osorio, Jol. Roux & Z.W. de Beer (2016)
- Lasiodiplodia caatinguensis I.B.L. Cout., F.C. Freire, C.S. Lima & J.E. Cardoso (2017)
- Lasiodiplodia chinensis Z.P. Dou & Y. Zhang ter (2017)
- Lasiodiplodia chonburiensis Tibpromma & K.D. Hyde (2018)
- Lasiodiplodia cinnamomi C.M. Tian & N. Jiang (2018)
- Lasiodiplodia citri Av.-Saccá (1917)
- Lasiodiplodia citricola Abdollahz., Javadi & A.J.L. Phillips (2010)
- Lasiodiplodia crassispora T.I. Burgess & P.A. Barber (2006)
- Lasiodiplodia curvata Y. Zhang ter & S. Lin (2019)
- Lasiodiplodia egyptiaca A.M. Ismail, L. Lombard & Crous (2012)
- Lasiodiplodia endophytica N.I. de Silva, A.J.L. Phillips & K.D. Hyde (2019)
- Lasiodiplodia euphorbiaceicola A.R. Machado & O.L. Pereira (2014)
- Lasiodiplodia exigua Linald., Deidda & A.J.L. Phillips (2014)
- Lasiodiplodia fiorii Bacc. (1910)
- Lasiodiplodia frezaliana Faurel & Schotter (1956)
- Lasiodiplodia gilanensis Abdollahz., Javadi & A.J.L. Phillips (2010)
- Lasiodiplodia gonubiensis Pavlic, Slippers & M.J. Wingf. (2004)
- Lasiodiplodia gravistriata M.S.B. Netto & M.P.S. Câmara (2016)
- Lasiodiplodia hormozganensis Abdollahz., Zare & A.J.L. Phillips (2010)
- Lasiodiplodia hyalina Z.P. Dou & Ying Zhang (2017)
- Lasiodiplodia indica Prasher & Gargi Singh (2014)
- Lasiodiplodia iraniensis Abdollahz., Zare & A.J.L. Phillips (2010)
- Lasiodiplodia irregularis Y. Zhang ter & S. Lin (2019)
- Lasiodiplodia jatrophicola A.R. Machado & O.L. Pereira (2014)
- Lasiodiplodia krabiensis Dayar. (2020)
- Lasiodiplodia laeliocattleyae (Sibilia) A. Alves (2017)
- Lasiodiplodia laosensis Y. Zhang ter & S. Lin (2019)
- Lasiodiplodia lignicola (Ariyaw., Jian K. Liu & K.D. Hyde) A.J.L. Phillips, A. Alves & Abdollahz. (2013)
- Lasiodiplodia macroconidia Y. Zhang ter & S. Lin (2019)
- Lasiodiplodia macrospora A.R. Machado & O.L. Pereira (2014)
- Lasiodiplodia magnoliae N.I. de Silva, A.J.L. Phillips & K.D. Hyde (2019)
- Lasiodiplodia mahajangana Begoude, Jol. Roux & Slippers (2010)
- Lasiodiplodia margaritacea Pavlic, T.I. Burgess & M.J. Wingf. (2008)
- Lasiodiplodia marypalmiae M.S.B. Netto, M.W. Marques, A.J.L. Phillips & M.P.S. Câmara (2014)
- Lasiodiplodia mediterranea Linald., Deidda & Berraf-Tebbal (2014)
- Lasiodiplodia microconidia Y. Zhang ter & S. Lin (2019)
- Lasiodiplodia missouriana Úrbez-Torr., Peduto & Gubler (2012)
- Lasiodiplodia nigra Appel & Laubert (1907)
- Lasiodiplodia pandanicola Tibpromma & K.D. Hyde (2018)
- Lasiodiplodia paraphysaria (Sacc.) Keissl. (1918)
- Lasiodiplodia parva A.J.L. Phillips, A. Alves & Crous (2008)
- Lasiodiplodia plurivora Damm & Crous (2008)
- Lasiodiplodia pontae I.B.L. Cout., F.C. Freire, C.S. Lima & J.E. Cardoso (2017)
- Lasiodiplodia pseudotheobromae A.J.L. Phillips, A. Alves & Crous (2008)
- Lasiodiplodia pyriformis F.J.J. Van der Walt, Slippers & G.J. Marais (2014)
- Lasiodiplodia ricini Sacc. (1915)
- Lasiodiplodia rubropurpurea T.I. Burgess, P.A. Barber & Pegg (2006)
- Lasiodiplodia sterculiae Tao Yang & Crous (2016)
- Lasiodiplodia subglobosa A.R. Machado & O.L. Pereira (2014)
- Lasiodiplodia swieteniae Jayasiri, E.B.G. Jones & K.D. Hyde (2019)
- Lasiodiplodia tenuiconidia Y. Zhang ter & S. Lin (2019)
- Lasiodiplodia thailandica Trakun., L. Lombard & Crous (2014)
- Lasiodiplodia theobromae (Pat.) Griffon & Maubl. (1909)
- Lasiodiplodia thomasiana Sacc. (1908)
- Lasiodiplodia tropica Y. Zhang ter & S. Lin (2019)
- Lasiodiplodia undulata (Berk. & M.A. Curtis) Abbas, B. Sutton, Ghaffar & Abbas (2004)
- Lasiodiplodia vaccinii Y. Zhang ter & L. Zhao (2019)
- Lasiodiplodia venezuelensis T.I. Burgess, P.A. Barber & Mohali (2006)
- Lasiodiplodia viticola Úrbez-Torr., Peduto & Gubler (2012)
- Lasiodiplodia vitis Tao Yang & Crous (2016)

Former species;

- L. abnormis Traverso & Spessa (1913) = Granulodiplodia abnormis
- L. nigra Griffon & Maubl. (1909) = Lasiodiplodia theobromae
- L. tubericola Ellis & Everh. (1896) = Lasiodiplodia theobromae
- L. triflorae B.B. Higgins (1916) = Lasiodiplodia theobromae
