= Sivanesania =

Scientific classification
- Kingdom: Fungi
- Division: Ascomycota
- Class: Dothideomycetes
- Order: Botryosphaeriales
- Family: Botryosphaeriaceae
- Genus: Sivanesania; W.H. Hsieh & C.Y. Chen

Species
- Sivanesania rubi

Genus of fungi

Sivanesania is a genus of fungi in the family Botryosphaeriaceae for which there is the sole species Sivanesania rubi.
