= Saccharata =

Scientific classification
- Kingdom: Fungi
- Division: Ascomycota
- Class: Dothideomycetes
- Order: Botryosphaeriales
- Family: Botryosphaeriaceae
- Genus: Saccharata; Denman & Crous

Species
- See text.

Genus of fungi

Saccharata is a genus of fungi in the family Botryosphaeriaceae. There are 4 species.

== Species ==
- Saccharata capensis
- Saccharata intermedia
- Saccharata kirstenboschensis
- Saccharata proteae
