= Phaeobotryon cupressi =

Scientific classification
- Kingdom: Fungi
- Division: Ascomycota
- Class: Dothideomycetes
- Order: Botryosphaeriales
- Family: Botryosphaeriaceae
- Genus: Phaeobotryon
- Species: P. cupressi

Binomial name
- Phaeobotryon cupressi Abdollahzadeh et al. (2009)

Species of fungus

Phaeobotryon cupressi is an endophytic fungus first found on Cupressus sempervirens in Iran.
