= Dichomera =

Scientific classification
- Domain: Eukaryota
- Kingdom: Fungi
- Division: Ascomycota
- Class: Dothideomycetes
- Order: Botryosphaeriales
- Family: Botryosphaeriaceae
- Genus: Dichomera; Cooke (1878)

Type species
- Dichomera saubinetii (Mont.) Cooke (1878)

Species
- See text.

Genus of fungi

Dichomera is a genus of fungi in the family Botryosphaeriaceae. There are 39 species.

== Species ==
- Dichomera camarosporioides Naumov 1927
- Dichomera capparis Munjal & J.N. Kapoor 1963
- Dichomera carpini Griffon & Maubl. 1909
- Dichomera clethrae Dearn. 1924
- Dichomera coluteae Golovin 1950
- Dichomera compositarum Cooke & Harkn. 1880
- Dichomera cytisi (Berl. & Bres.) Peyronel
- Dichomera elaeagni P. Karst.
- Dichomera firmianae Koshk. & Frolov 1973
- Dichomera gemmicola A. Funk & B. Sutton 1972
- Dichomera gymnosporiae S. Ahmad 1955
- Dichomera heterospora M.E.A. Costa & Sousa da Câmara 1953
- Dichomera inclusa M.T. Lucas & Sousa da Câmara 1953
- Dichomera juglandis Ellis & Everh. 1897
- Dichomera laburni Cooke & Massee 1890
- Dichomera macrospora S. Ahmad 1955, N.D. Sharma 1980
- Dichomera moricola S. Ahmad & Arshad 1972
- Dichomera mutabilis (Berk. & Broome) Sacc. 1884
- Dichomera neorhamni B. Sutton & Dyko 1989
- Dichomera oreades Cooke
- Dichomera persicae Pass.
- Dichomera persooniae Henn. 1903
- Dichomera phaceliae Cooke & Harkn.
- Dichomera prunicola Ellis & Dearn. 1905
- Dichomera rhamni (Westend.) Sacc. 1884
- Dichomera rhamnicola (Cooke) B. Sutton & Dyko 1989
- Dichomera rhoina Cooke & Harkn.
- Dichomera ribicola Grove 1937; Frolov 1968
- Dichomera ripidiomorpha M.T. Lucas & Sousa da Câmara 1954
- Dichomera rosarum S. Ahmad 1964
- Dichomera sphaerosperma (Berk. & M.A. Curtis) Sacc.
- Dichomera stromatica (Preuss) Sacc.
- Dichomera tiliae (Therry) Sacc. 1884
- Dichomera tragacanthae Kurbans. 1980
- Dichomera trichurensis V.G. Rao & Varghese 1980
- Dichomera varia Died. 1914
- Dichomera versiformis Z.Q. Yuan, Wardlaw & C. Mohammed 2000
- Dichomera viticola Cooke & Harkn. 1881; Maire 1913
