= Neodeightonia =

Scientific classification
- Kingdom: Fungi
- Division: Ascomycota
- Class: Dothideomycetes
- Order: Botryosphaeriales
- Family: Botryosphaeriaceae
- Genus: Neodeightonia; C. Booth 1970

Species
- Neodeightonia palmicola J.K. Liu, Phookamsak & K.D. Hyde, 2010; Neodeightonia phoenicum A.J.L. Phillips & Crous, 2008; Neodeightonia subglobosa C. Booth, 1970

Genus of fungi

Neodeightonia is a genus of fungi in the family Botryosphaeriaceae. There are three known species.
