= Traversoa =

Scientific classification
- Kingdom: Fungi
- Division: Ascomycota
- Class: Dothideomycetes
- Order: Botryosphaeriales
- Family: Botryosphaeriaceae
- Genus: Traversoa; Sacc., Syd. & P.Syd. (1913)

Type species
- Traversoa dothiorelloides Sacc., Syd. & P. Syd. (1913)

Genus of fungi

Traversoa is a genus of fungi in the Botryosphaeriaceae family.

The genus was circumscribed by Pier Andrea Saccardo, Hans Sydow and Paul Sydow in Ann. Mycol. vol.11 on page 317 in 1913.

The genus name of Traversoa is in honour of Giovanni Battista Traverso (1878–1955), who was an Italian mycologist and plant pathologist.

== Species ==
As accepted by Species Fungorum;

- Traversoa dothiorelloides Sacc., Syd. & P. Syd. (1913)

Former species;

- T. agaves Petr. (1923) = Botryodiplodia agaves, Diaporthales family
- T. excipuloides Sacc., Syd. & P. Syd. (1913) = Botryodiplodia excipuloides, Diaporthales
- T. excipuloides var. distans Sacc., Syd. & P. Syd. (1913) = Botryodiplodia excipuloides, Diaporthales
- T. gallicola (Sacc.) Petr. (1924) = Botryodiplodia gallicola, Diaporthales
