= Planistromellaceae =

Scientific classification
- Kingdom: Fungi
- Division: Ascomycota
- Class: Dothideomycetes
- Order: Botryosphaeriales
- Family: Planistromellaceae; M.E. Barr

Type genus
- Planistromella A.W. Ramaley

Family of fungi

The Planistromellaceae are a family of fungi, with in the order Botryosphaeriales.

In 2007, they were formerly, placed in the Dothideales order of the Dothideomycetes class.

== Genera ==
As accepted by Wijayawardene et al. 2020;

- Kellermania Ellis & Everh. (ca. 16 species)
- Umthunziomyces Crous & M.J. Wingf. (1)
