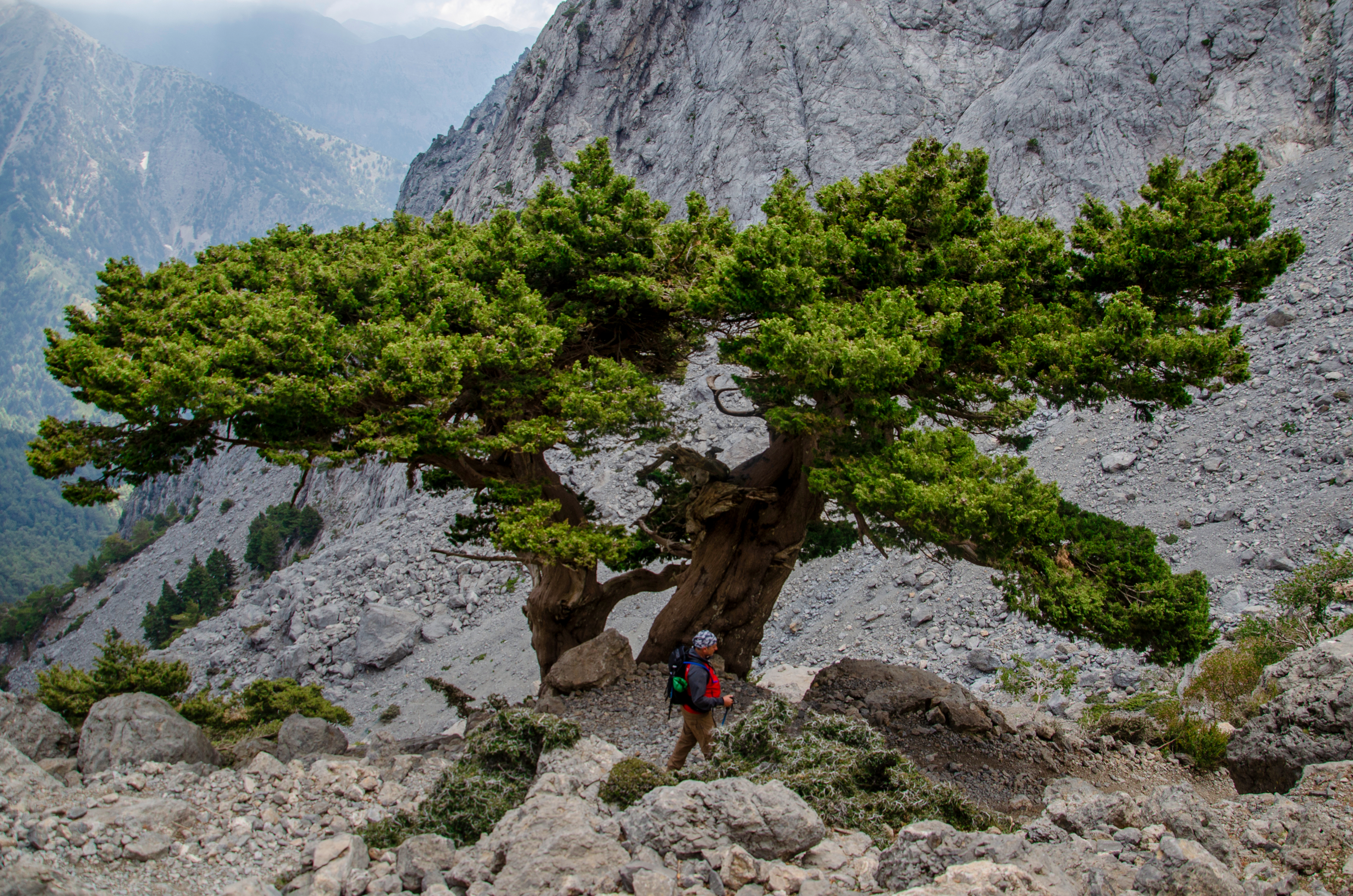
- Native tree at Lefka Ori, Crete
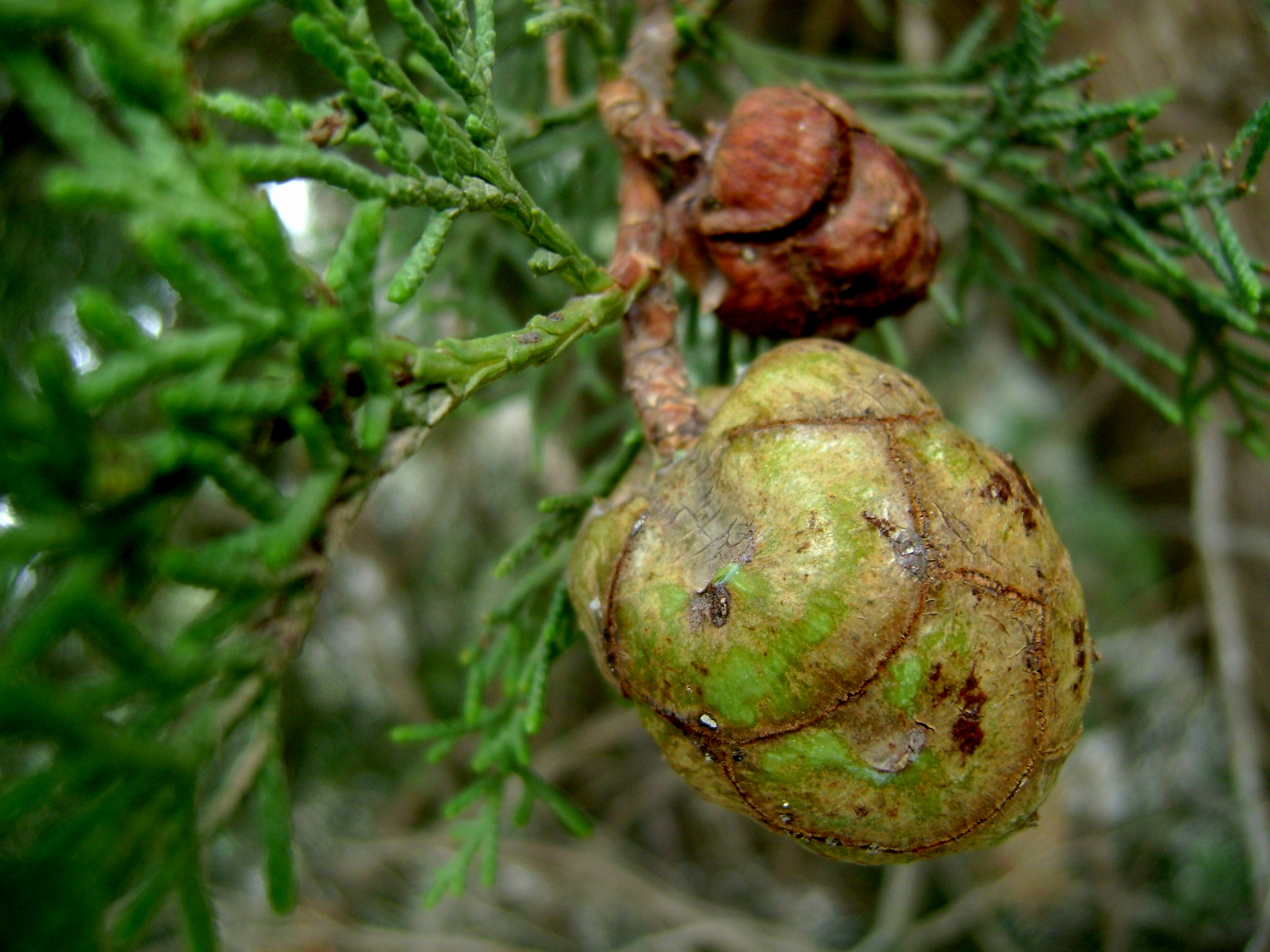
- Foliage and cone

Conservation status
- Least Concern (IUCN 3.1)

Scientific classification
- Kingdom: Plantae
- Clade: Tracheophytes
- Clade: Gymnosperms
- Division: Pinophyta
- Class: Pinopsida
- Order: Cupressales
- Family: Cupressaceae
- Genus: Cupressus
- Species: C. sempervirens

Binomial name
- Cupressus sempervirens L.
- Green: probable natural range in the Mediterranean Basin; Orange: range including human introductions Red (small areas): Residual natural stands

= Cupressus sempervirens =

Species of conifer

Cupressus sempervirens, the Mediterranean cypress, Italian cypress, Tuscan cypress, or Persian cypress, is a species of conifer in the family Cupressaceae, a cypress native to the eastern Mediterranean region and Iran. It is widespread throughout the Mediterranean basin and has become endemic in similar dry summer climates due to its ability to survive in both acidic and alkaline soils and withstand drought.

Cupressus sempervirens is important in Mediterranean and Middle Eastern culture; it has long been valued for its role in symbolism, various rituals, and folk medicine. In Iran it is both a sacred tree and a metaphor for "the graceful figure of the beloved". It is popular around the world as an ornamental tree and has been studied for possible medicinal properties.

In Israel, vestiges of wild specimens can be found but the majority of Mediterranean cypress trees are the result of intentional reforestation on the behalf of the JNF, and are common at cemeteries, parks, and within wooded areas.

== Description ==
Cupressus sempervirens is a medium-sized coniferous tree growing up to 35 m (115 ft) tall, with a conic crown with level branches and variably loosely hanging branchlets. It is very long-lived, with some trees reported to be over 1,000 years old.

Cupressis sempervirens produces lateral shoots, or branches, which often grow upwards towards a light source. The foliage grows in dense, dark green sprays. The leaves are scale-like, 2–5 mm long, and produced on rounded (not flattened) shoots. The seed cones are ovoid or oblong and 25–40 mm long. The cones have 10–14 scales, which are green at first and mature to brown about 20–24 months after pollination. The male cones are 3–5 mm long and release highly allergenic pollen in late winter. The cones of C. sempervirens can withstand years of being sealed and are known to perform serotiny. The tree is moderately susceptible to cypress canker, caused by the fungus Seiridium cardinale, and can suffer extensive dieback where this disease is common. The species name sempervirens comes from the Latin for 'evergreen'.

== Uses ==
C. sempervirens has been widely cultivated as an ornamental tree for millennia outside its native range, mainly throughout the Mediterranean region and in other areas with similar hot, dry summers and mild, rainy winters, including California, southwest South Africa, and southern Australia. It can also be grown successfully in areas with cooler, moister summers, such as the British Isles, New Zealand, and the Pacific Northwest, as well as in humid, subtropical environments such as the coastal southern United States. In some areas, particularly the United States, it is known as "Italian" or "Tuscan cypress". Within its native range, C. sempervirens has historically been planted in gardens and cemeteries and used as a windbreak alongside roads. The tree can also prevent damage to land caused by violent weather.

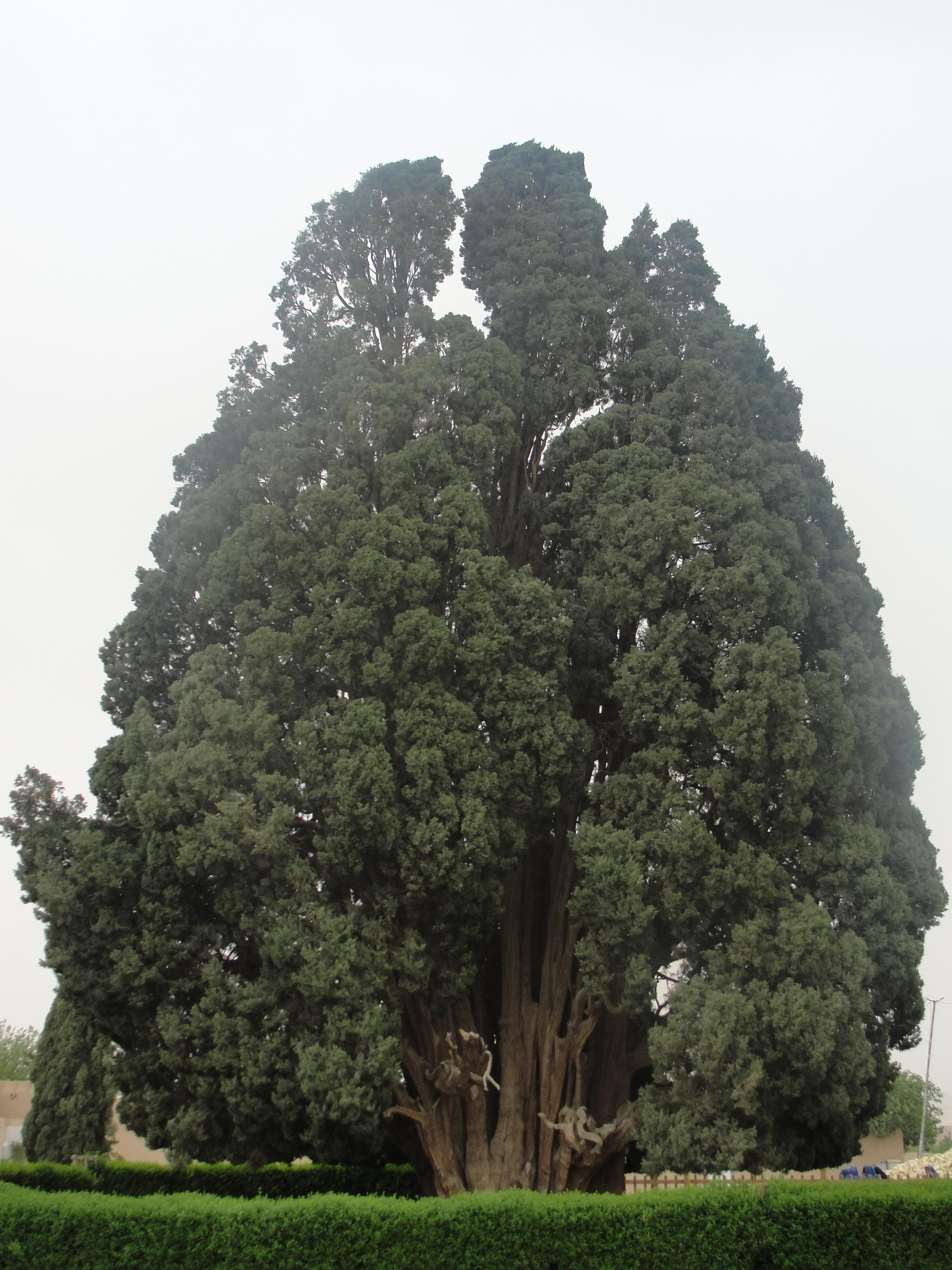
The Cypress of Abarkuh, Iran

The vast majority of the trees in cultivation are selected cultivars with a fastigiate crown, with erect branches forming a narrow to very narrow crown often less than a tenth as wide as the tree is tall. The dark green "exclamation mark" shape of these trees is a highly characteristic signature of Mediterranean landscapes.

A 2009 investigation discovered two new species of fungi on the tree, including Phaeobotryon cupressi.

=== Fire resistance ===
Unlike many Cupressus species, C. sempervirens has low resin content, and does not readily catch or spread fire. In July 2012, a forest fire lasting five days burned 20,000 hectares of forest in the Valencian village of Andilla. However, a group of 946 cypress trees about 22 years old was virtually unharmed, with only 12 cypresses being burnt. The Andilla cypresses had been planted by the CypFire European project to study various aspects of the cypresses, including fire resistance. This is leading to considerable interest in its use in creating firebreaks in areas prone to wildfire.

=== Cosmetic and medicinal uses ===
While some studies show C. sempervirens has modern medicinal properties, it is most noted for uses in folk medicine, where the dried leaves of the plant are used to treat various ailments. In cosmetics, it is used as an astringent, for firming, as an anti-seborrheic, for anti-dandruff, for anti-aging and as a fragrance. It is also the traditional wood used for Italian harpsichords.

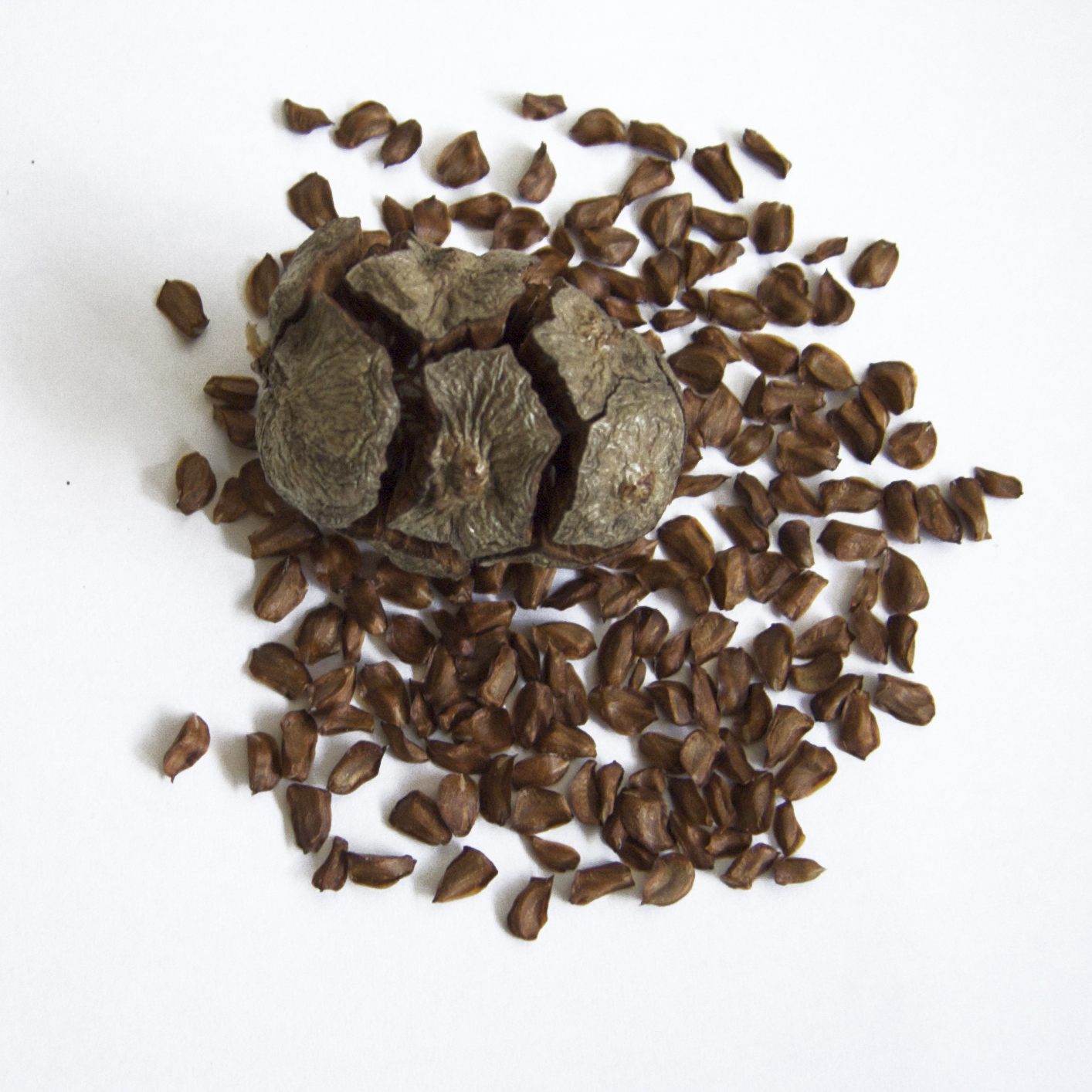
Open cone with seeds

Dried seeds of Cupressus sempervirens are sometimes used to help people control skin conditions such as acne and to heal cuts or scrapes. The oil from the leaves of the plant can aid in recovery from minor ailments like nasal congestion.

== Habitats ==
Cupressus sempervirens grows primarily in places with wet winters and hot summers; in the spring and autumn, the tree grows out its roots, stems, and leaves. Like most plants, it requires light for such growth. Because the tree must survive wet winters and hot, dry summers, its roots are adapted to be stout and shallow for easier gathering of the nutrients in the soil. The roots are adapted to function in both acidic and alkaline soils.

== Distribution ==
The species is indigenous to the eastern Mediterranean, i.e. Lebanon,Turkey, Iran, and Iraq, right through to the Himalayas. It is also native to Greece in such places as Crete, where a wild population continually regenerates. It is also found in Libya, Algeria and Morocco in North Africa.

Some claim that the tree wasa major component of the ancient Israelite forest. However, based on ancient writings, pollen grain analysis, and ancient wooden remnants, there are others who disagree, claiming that cypress wood used in ancient Israelite construction was imported. In any case, it is certainly a component of forested areas in modern Israel, particularly on the Betset Stream Cliffs in the mountainous Upper Galilee, as well as on Mount Hermon in the Golan Heights.

== In culture ==
=== Iran ===
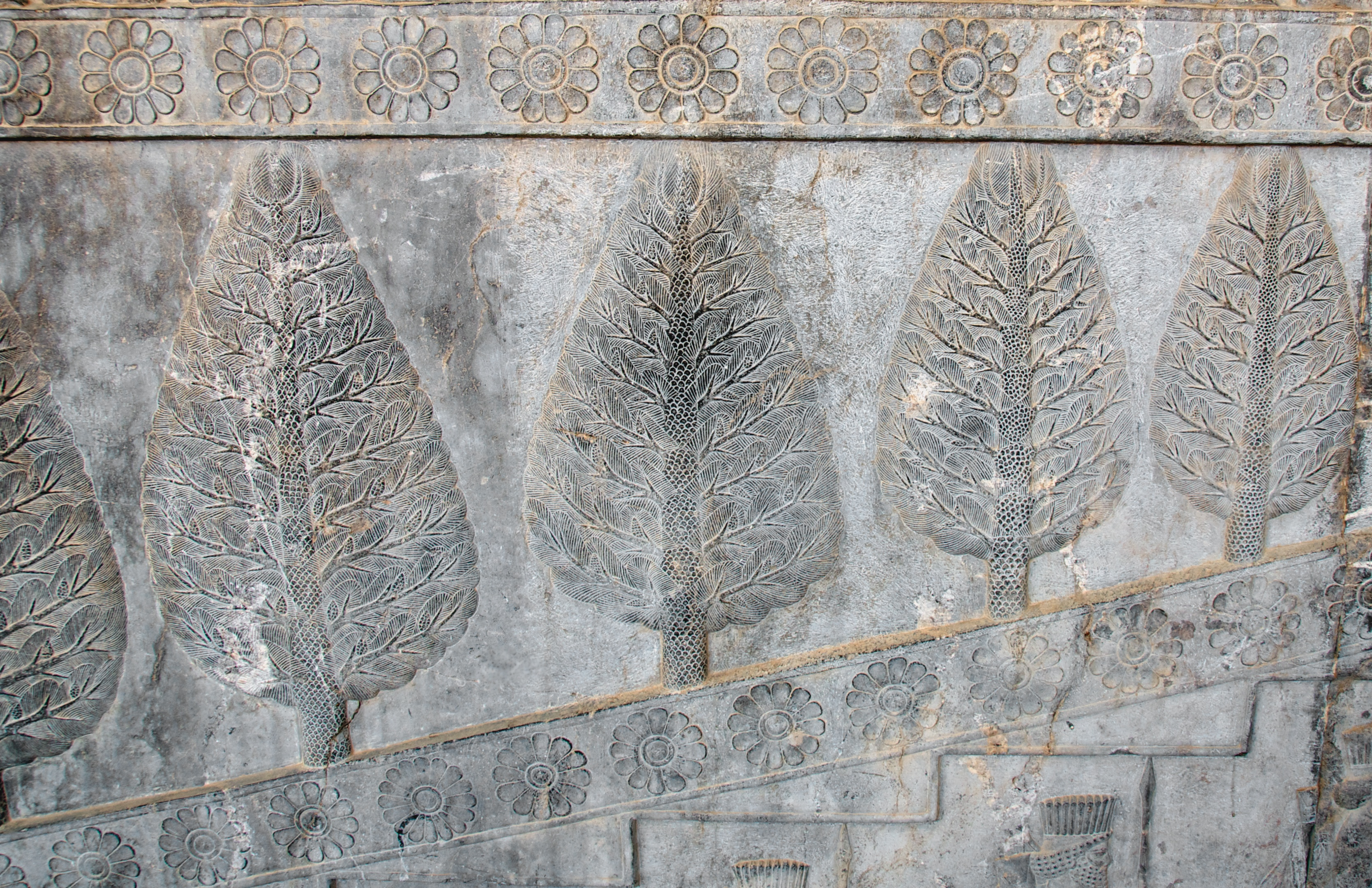
Stylized Cypress Trees from Persepolis, Shiraz, Iran. One of the three varieties of C. sempervirens native to Iran is called the Shirazi Cypress.

In Persian, C. sempervirens is called the "Graceful Cypress" (sarv-e nāz), and has a strong presence in culture, poetry and gardens. It bears several metaphors, including the "graceful figure and stately gait of [the] beloved". Iranians considered cypress to be a relic of Zoroaster. A Zoroastrian tradition recorded by Daqiqi maintains that King Vishtaspa, after converting to Zoroastrianism, ordered a cypress brought from paradise by Zoroaster to be planted near the first fire temple.

The oldest living cypress is possibly the Sarv-e-Abarkooh in Iran's Yazd Province; it is estimated to be approximately 4,000 years old, although its exact age has not been determined.

=== Symbolism ===
In classical antiquity, the cypress was a symbol of mourning, and in the modern era, it remains the principal cemetery tree in both the Muslim world and Europe. This afterlife association also exists within the Jewish tradition, and since the tree approximates the shape of a candle, a representation of the soul in both Judaism and Islam, it is also common in cemeteries of both faiths in Israel. In the classical tradition, the cypress was associated with death and the underworld because it cannot regenerate when cut back too severely. Athenian households in mourning were garlanded with boughs of cypress. Cypress was used to fumigate the air during cremations. It was among the plants that were suitable for making wreaths to adorn statues of Pluto, the classical ruler of the underworld. This afterlife association also exists within both. the Jewish and Moslem traditions, since the tree approximates the shape of a candle, a representation of the soul in both faiths.

However, the tree had opposing symbolism in some other cultures, where it was seen as a mark of tenacity and long life.

The poet Ovid, who wrote during the reign of Augustus, records the best-known myth that explains the association of the cypress with grief: Cyparissus, a handsome favourite and lover of Apollo, accidentally killed a beloved tame stag. His grief and remorse were so inconsolable that he asked to weep forever. He thus was transformed into a cypress tree, his tears becoming the tree's sap. In another version of the story, it was the woodland god Silvanus who was the divine companion of Cyparissus and accidentally killed the stag. When the boy was consumed by grief, Silvanus turned him into a tree and thereafter carried a branch of cypress as a symbol of mourning.

In Jewish tradition, Mediterranean cypress is held to be the wood used to build Noah's Ark and Solomon's Temple, and is mentioned as an idiom or metaphor in biblical passages, either referencing the tree's shape as an example of uprightness or its evergreen nature as an example of eternal beauty or health. The tree features in classical Aramaic writings.

In popular culture, C. sempervirens is often stereotypically associated with vacation destinations in the Mediterranean region, especially Italy. The tree has been seen on travel posters for decades.

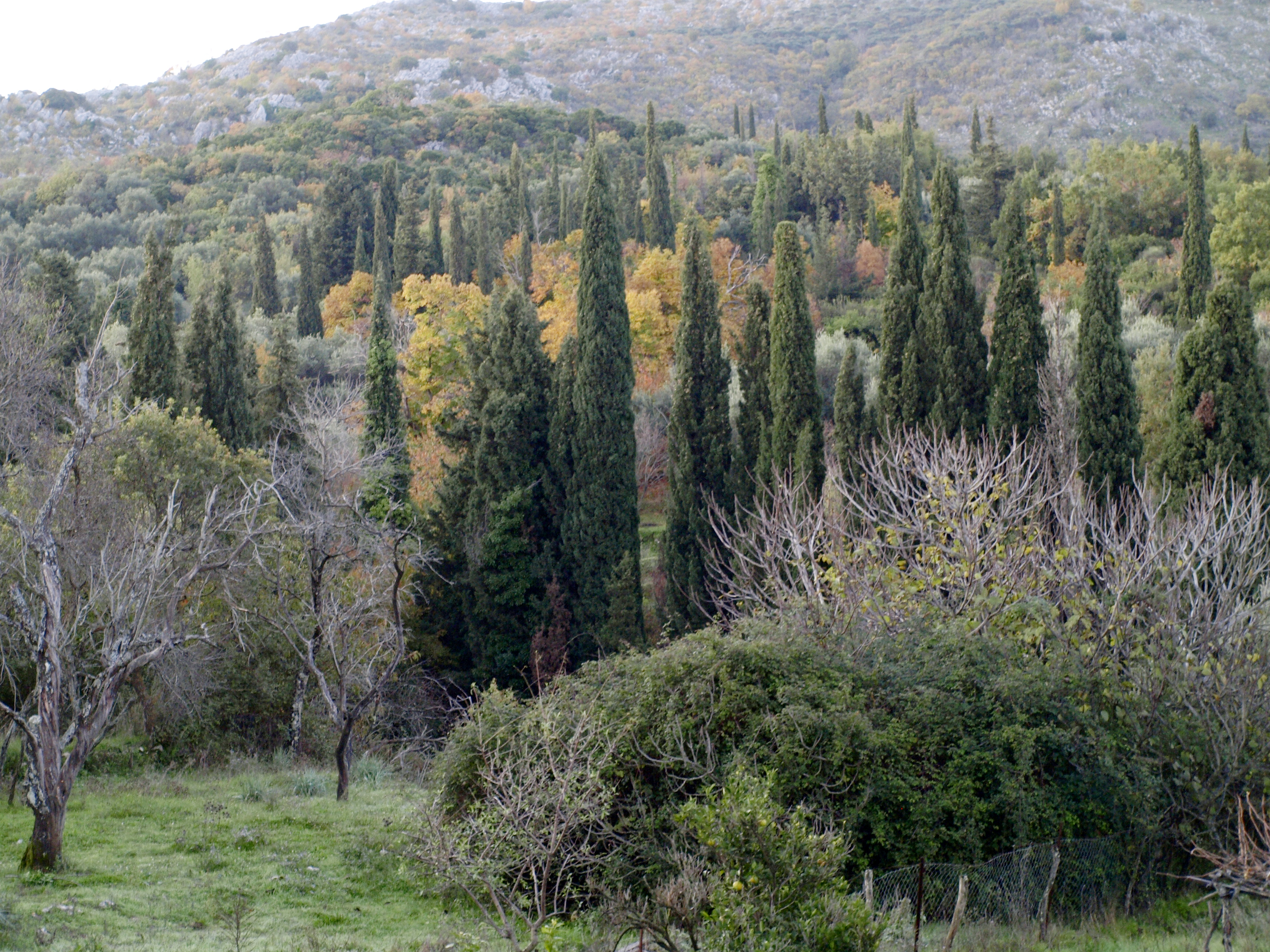
Fastigiate Mediterranean cypresses in Corfu, Greece.

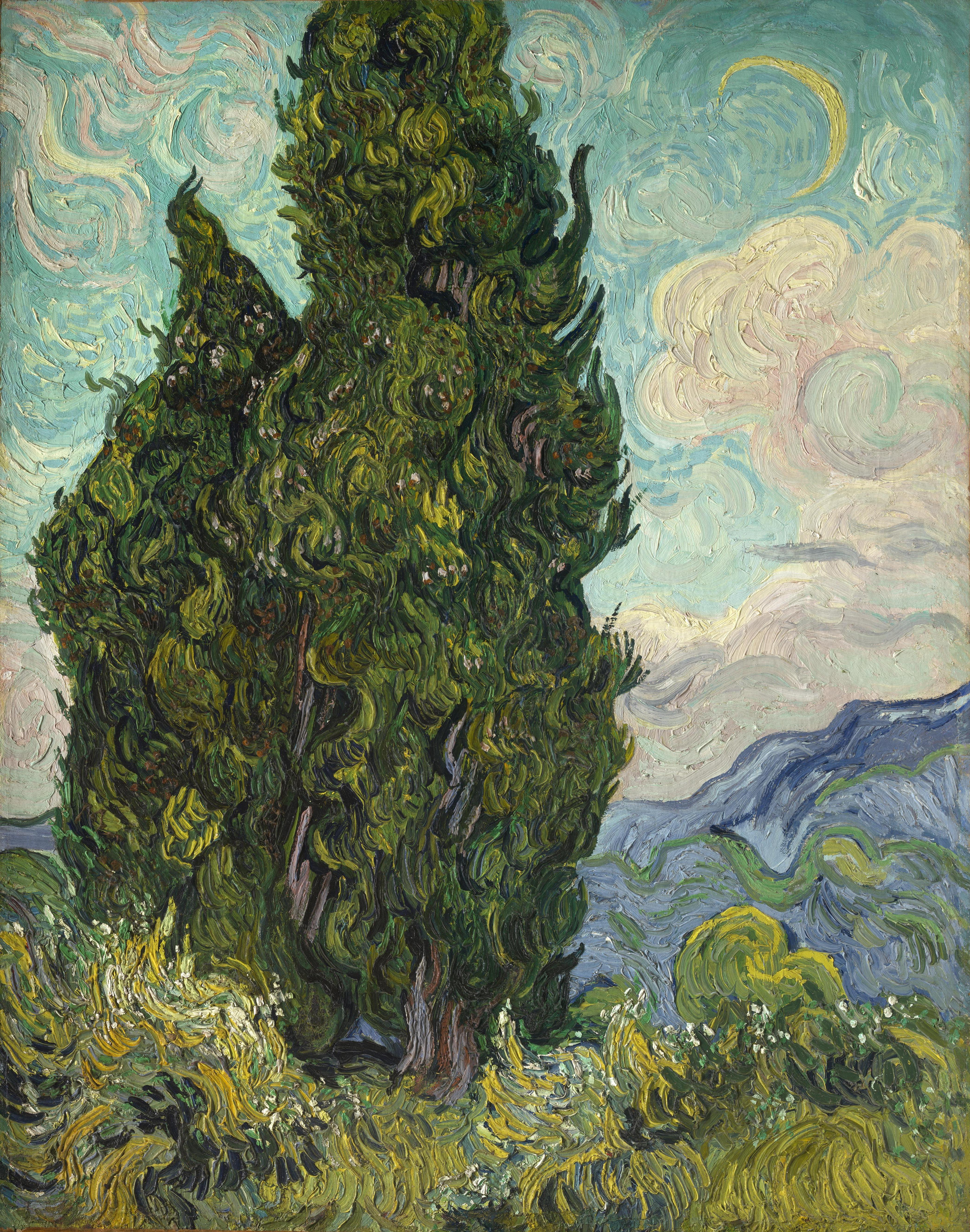
Cypresses (1889) by Vincent van Gogh, Saint-Rémy-de-Provence. Other van Gogh cypress paintings include Wheat Field with Cypresses and The Starry Night.

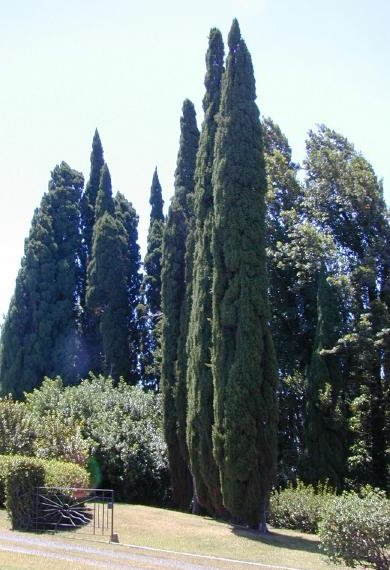
Fastigiate Mediterranean cypress C. sempervirens 'Stricta', planted in Hawaii.

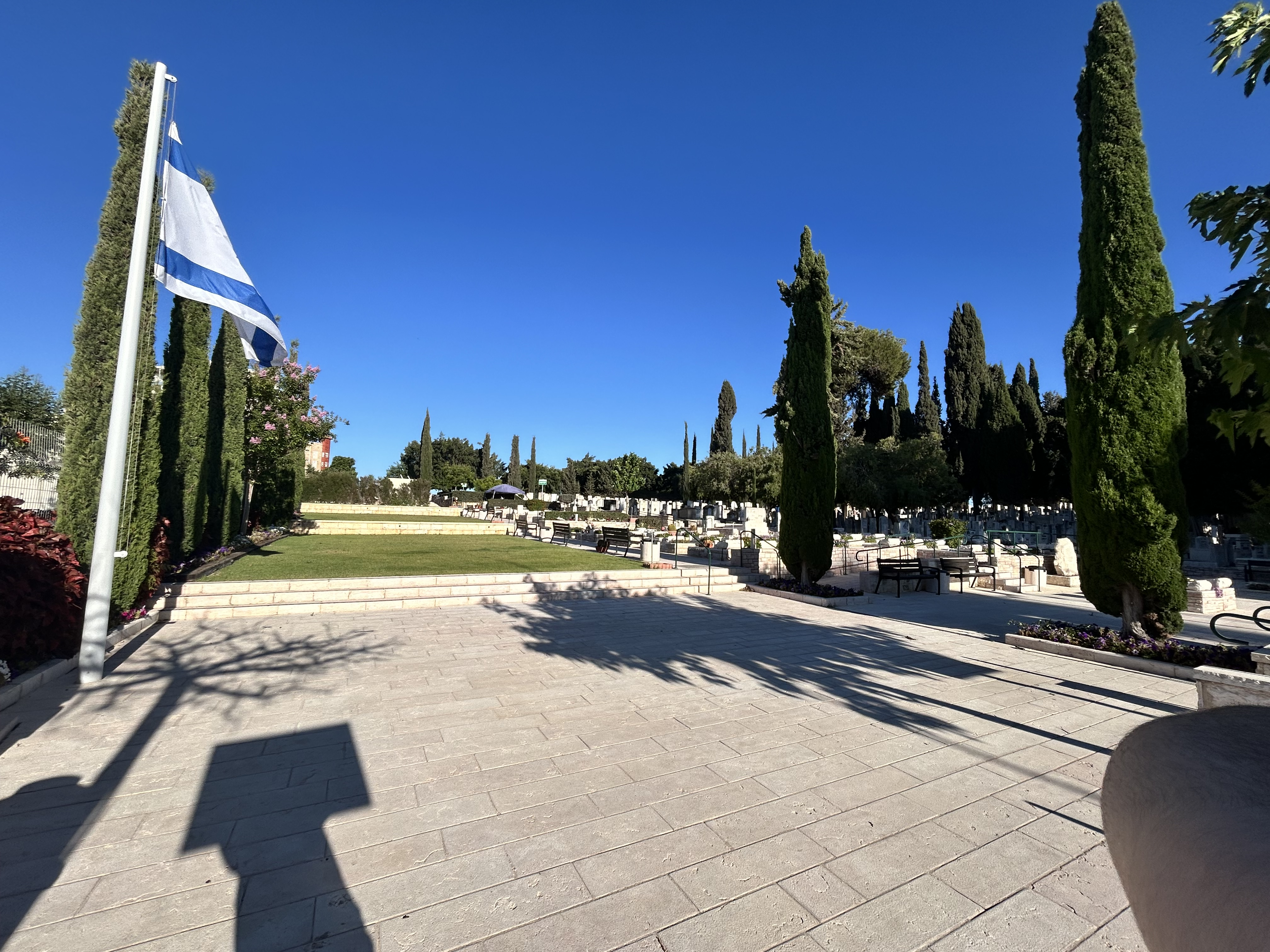
At the Ness Ziona Cemetery in Israel
