= Metameris =

Scientific classification
- Kingdom: Fungi
- Division: Ascomycota
- Class: Dothideomycetes
- Order: Pleosporales
- Family: Phaeosphaeriaceae
- Genus: Metameris; Theiss. & Syd.

Type species
- Metameris japonica (Syd.) Syd.

Genus of fungi

Metameris is a genus of fungi in the family Phaeosphaeriaceae. This is a monotypic genus, containing the single species Metameris japonica.
