= Diplodia tip blight =

Fungal disease of conifers

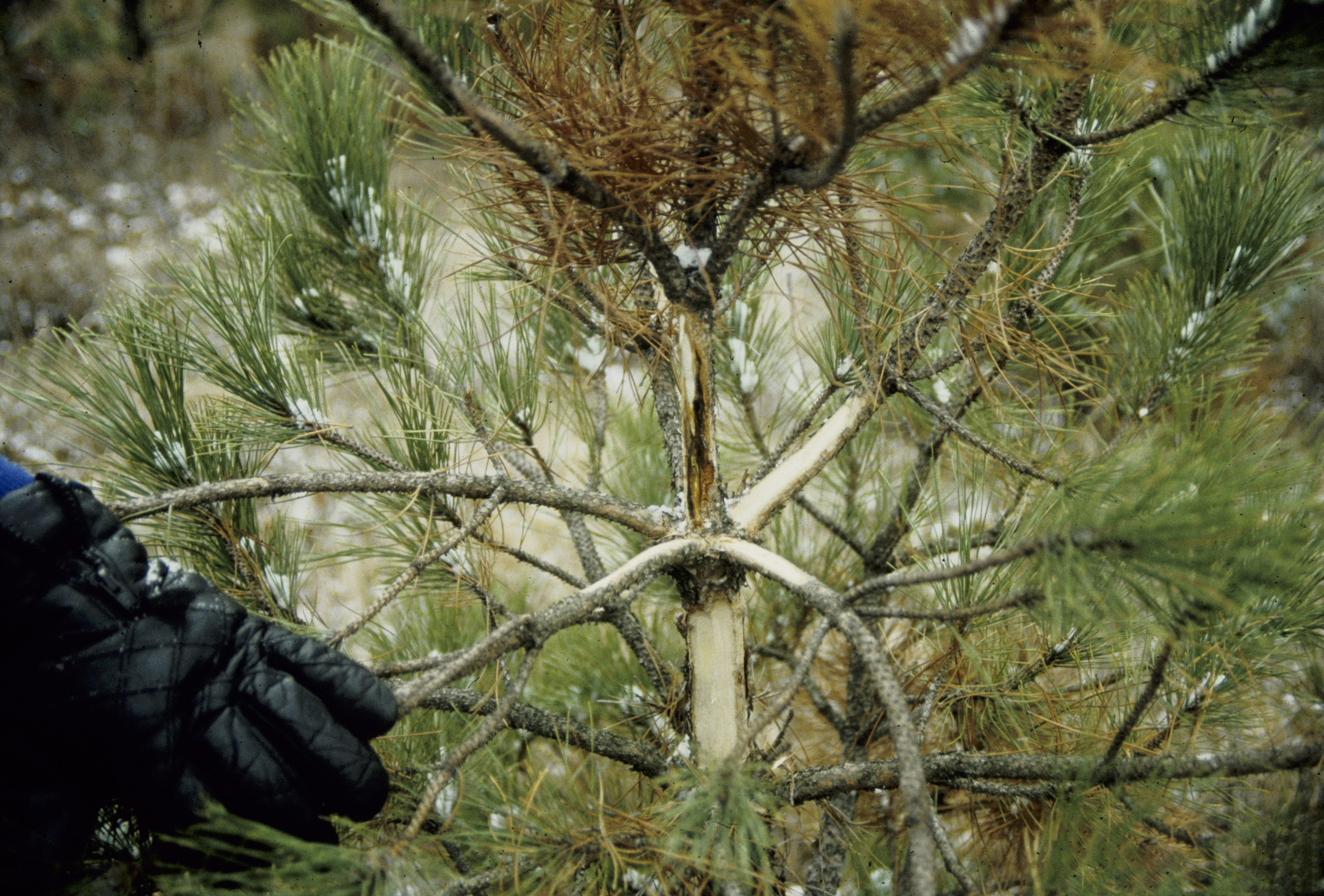
- Red pine (Pinus resinosa) with bark removed to show dark wood staining caused by Diplodia tip blight
- Common names: dieback of pine shoot blight of conifers shoot dieback of conifers tip blight of conifers twig blight of conifers whorl canker of pine
- Causal agents: Diplodia sapinea
- Hosts: pine trees
- EPPO Code: DIPDPI
- Distribution: United States

Diplodia tip blight, also known as Sphaeropsis blight, is a widespread disease affecting conifers caused by an opportunistic fungal pathogen, Diplodia sapinea. It is found in "both hemispheres between the latitudes 30° and 50° north and south". The diseases symptoms include: damping off and collar rot of seedlings, stem canker, root disease, and, most commonly, shoot blight. These symptoms have caused significant economic loss to nurseries and pine plantations. In a nursery in the north-central United States, losses of 35% have been reported. Shoot blight and eventual die back can cause a reduction of marketable volume in timber by 63%. Infection of terminal shoots can result in dead-top which significantly limits the usable length of the tree trunk. The presence of the pathogen in concert with severe weather conditions can lead to extreme loss. Following a severe hailstorm in South Africa, nearly 5,000 acres of pine plantation were infected with Diplodia tip blight. It was necessary to prematurely harvest large swaths of the plantations resulting in a loss of 45%. Areas that were not harvested prematurely still suffered an average timber loss of 11%.

== Hosts and symptoms ==
Diplodia tip blight is a common disease among conifers, especially pines. Scots pine, red pine, Mugo pine, Ponderosa pine, and Austrian pine are particularly susceptible. Some spruce, fir, and cedar species as well as Douglas fir are also vulnerable to infection. The disease can infect trees of all ages, though trees that are physiologically stressed through water or nutrient deficiencies or wounded via extreme weather or insect damage have a higher incidence of infection. The hallmark symptom of Diplodia tip blight is stunted, brown needles and stems, particularly of new shoots. The needles of infected shoots typically remain attached, are shorter than average and are tan colored. In particularly severe cases, entire branches can become infected. Resinous cankers can form on the stems, leading to disfigurement and sometimes death of the tree. In addition to the symptoms of the disease, signs of the pathogen are also evident in the late summer and fall as the fungal survival structures, pycnidia, are formed. The pycnidia appear as small black dots and can be found at the base of the needles, on the scales of the seed cones, and on the bark of the tree. The presence of these fungal survival structures in conjunction with the blighted shoots provides powerful diagnostic evidence for this disease.

== Disease cycle ==
The spores from Diplodia sapinea fungus typically first develop on the structures that will eventually develop on the "black fruiting structures that form on needles, fascicle sheaths, scales of second year seed cones, and bark" During the wet/rainy season, (depending on the location, could be from early spring until late fall) where the wet weather and wind can allow the spores to travel, as well as allow them to germinate the shoots and needles of the trees. Penetration of the shoots and needles normally occurs through the stomata opening or through the epidermis of young stems.

Once the needles are infected, the fungus quickly destroys the tissues within the needle which is the cause for the shoot and needles to become stunted and die after only a small amount of growth. The growth of the fungus is quick and deadly to the needles, traveling "through the needle, then to the stem, and finally into adjacent needles".

The needles and stems that have matured or have survived uninfected through the previous years growth, as well as the pollen cones do not normally become infected. It is usually the new needles that are just beginning to form or have yet to form that are most susceptible to attack. During the winter, the Diplodia sapinea fungus survives inside of "fruiting structures that develop on infected second-year cones, blighted needles, shoots, and cankers".

== Management ==
=== Cultural ===
Preventing the initial infection is a better strategy than attempting to cure a diseased tree. The first line of defense in preventing disease is planting disease free stock, planting in a disease free area, and selecting a disease resistant species. Beyond the selection of clean, resistant stock and planting location, trees that have proper water and nutrient management are healthier and less susceptible to Diplodia tip blight. Controlling wood boring insects that create wounds for Diplodia to exploit, is another cultural practice that can prevent disease. Poor airflow and high humidity are conditions that favor disease development; keeping grass and weeds trimmed down at the base of the tree allows for better airflow and can limit disease development. Once a tree is diseased, the goal is to limit the amount of inoculum present. The blighted needles and cones will have the pycnidia survival structures that contain thousands of spores. Remove debris from the base of the tree and destroy. During dry weather (not during Spring or early Summer), cut away infected shoots, cones, and branches. Sanitary techniques like sanitizing pruning tools between each cut will prevent further spread of the disease.

=== Chemical ===
When disease pressure is high, chemical controls is advised. First, spray should occur early spring at candle elongation. Repeated sprays should occur every two weeks until needles reach full size. Fungicides containing the following active ingredients have been shown to be efficacious: chlorothalonil, methyl, thiophanate-methyl, mancozeb, and copper hydroxide with mancozeb. Always read and follow the label.

=== Modelling ===
To predict the dynamics of D. sapinea disease outbreaks, especially from a prevention perspective, advanced environmental modeling tools such as GIS and species distribution models can also be used. For example, in Italy, it was shown that by using GIS and advanced environmental modeling tools, the main environmental variables influencing D. sapinea outbreaks include land cover, altitude, temperature (particularly the mean temperature of the driest and wettest quarters), precipitation of the wettest quarter, precipitation seasonality, and the minimum temperature of the coldest month. The distribution of the pathogen has expanded mainly in central and southern Italy and has shifted upward in altitude by approximately 93 meters on average. Moreover, under all climate change scenarios, the potential range of disease outbreaks increases in response to a rise in the mean temperature of the wettest and driest quarters by about 1.9 °C and 5.8 °C, respectively. Precipitation during the wettest quarter remains largely unchanged across future projections. Overall, D. sapinea is expected to affect increasingly larger areas of pine forests in Italy, potentially altering forest dynamics and threatening the long-term survival of these ecosystems.

== Sources ==
- Image gallery
- Uoguelph.ca
- UIUC.edu
