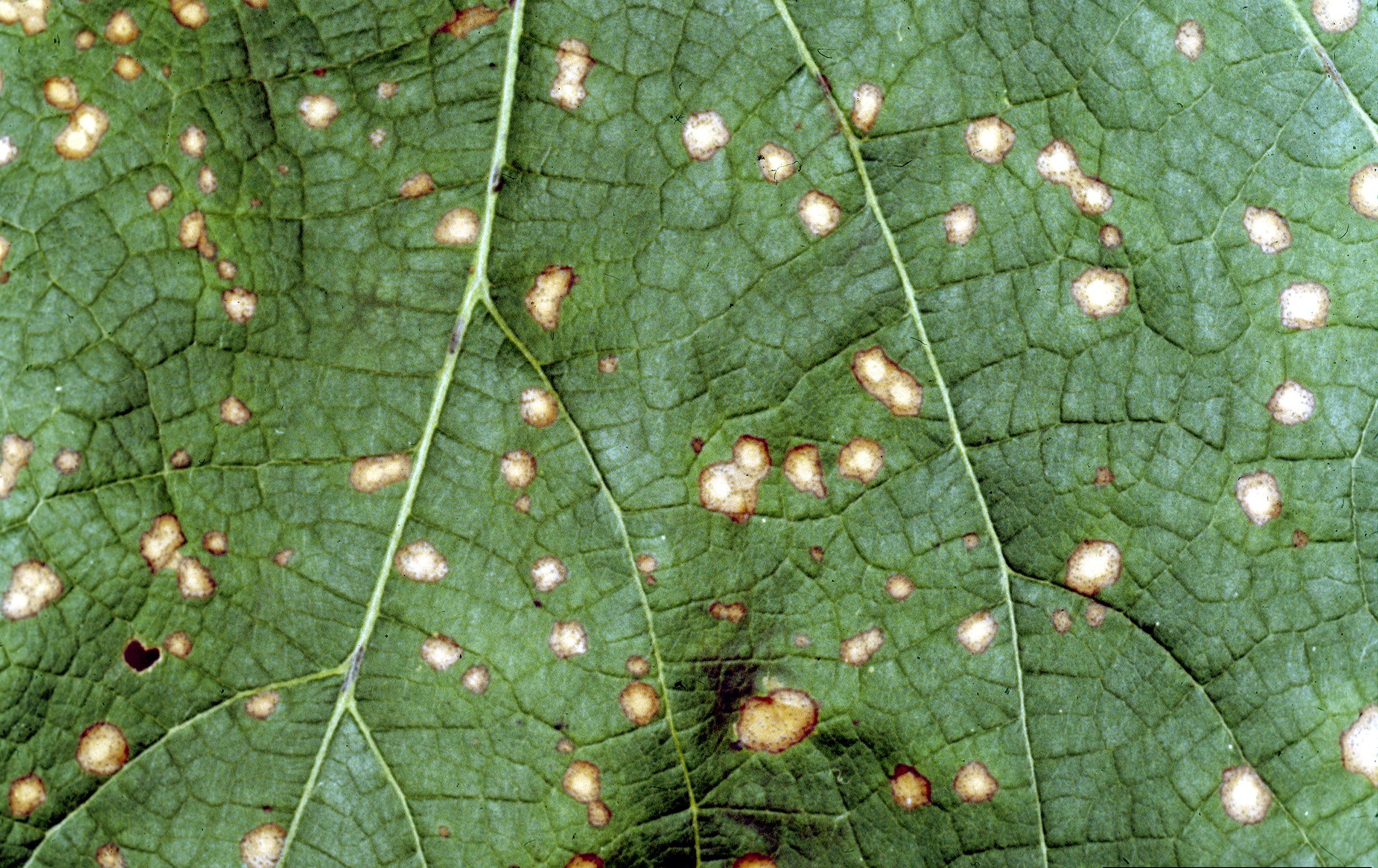
- leaf symptoms of Guignardia bidwellii

Scientific classification
- Kingdom: Fungi
- Division: Ascomycota
- Class: Dothideomycetes
- Order: Botryosphaeriales
- Family: Botryosphaeriaceae; Theiss. & H.Syd. (1918)

Genera
- 25 genera, see text

= Botryosphaeriaceae =

Family of fungi

The Botryosphaeriaceae are a family of sac fungi (Ascomycetes), which is the type representative of the order Botryosphaeriales. According to a 2008 estimate, the family contains 26 genera and over 1500 species. Members of this order include notable plant pathogens.

== Genera ==
This is a list of the genera in the Botryosphaeriaceae, based on a 2022 review and summary of fungal classification by Wijayawardene and colleagues. Following the genus name is the taxonomic authority (those who first circumscribed the genus; standardized author abbreviations are used), year of publication, and the number of species:

- Alanphillipsia Crous & M.J. Wingf. (2013) – 5 spp.
- Barriopsis A.J.L.Phillips, A.Alves & Crous (2008) – 5 spp.
- Botryobambusa Phook., Jian K.Liu & K.D.Hyde (2012) – 2 spp.
- Botryosphaeria Ces. & De Not. (1863) – 9 spp.
- Cophinforma Doilom, Jian K.Liu & K.D.Hyde (2012) (2)
- Dichomera C. Mont. (Cooke) (1878)
- Diplodia Fr. (1834) – more than 1000 spp.
- Dothiorella Sacc. (1880) – about 400 spp.
- Endomelanconiopsis E.I.Rojas & Samuels (2008) – 3 spp.
- Eutiarosporella Crous (2015) – 7 spp.
- Lasiodiplodia Ellis & Everh. (1896) –37 spp.
- Macrodothiorella Petrak & Sydow, 1927
- Macrophoma (Sacc.) Berl. & Voglino, 1886 (310)
- Macrophomina Petr. (1923) – 4 spp.
- Marasasiomyces Crous (2015) – 1 sp.
- Mucoharknessia Crous, R.M.Sánchez & Bianchin. (2015) – 2 spp.
- Neodeightonia C.Booth (1970) – 8 spp.
- Neofusicoccum Crous, Slippers & A.J.L.Phillips (2006) – 40 spp.
- Neoscytalidium Crous & Slippers (2006) – 1 sp.
- Oblongocollomyces Tao Yang & Crous (2017) – 1 sp.
- Phaeobotryon Theiss. & Syd. (1915) – 8 spp.
- Sakireeta Subram. & K.Ramakr. (1957) – 1 sp.
- Sardiniella Linald., A.Alves & A.J.L.Phillips (2016) – 3 spp.
- Septorioides W.Quaedvlieg, G.J.M.Verkley & P.W.Crous, 2013 (5)
- Sphaeropsis Sacc. (1880) – more than 600 spp.
- Tiarosporella Höhn. (1919) – 2 spp.
- Traversoa Sacc., Syd. & P.Syd. (1913) – 1 sp.
