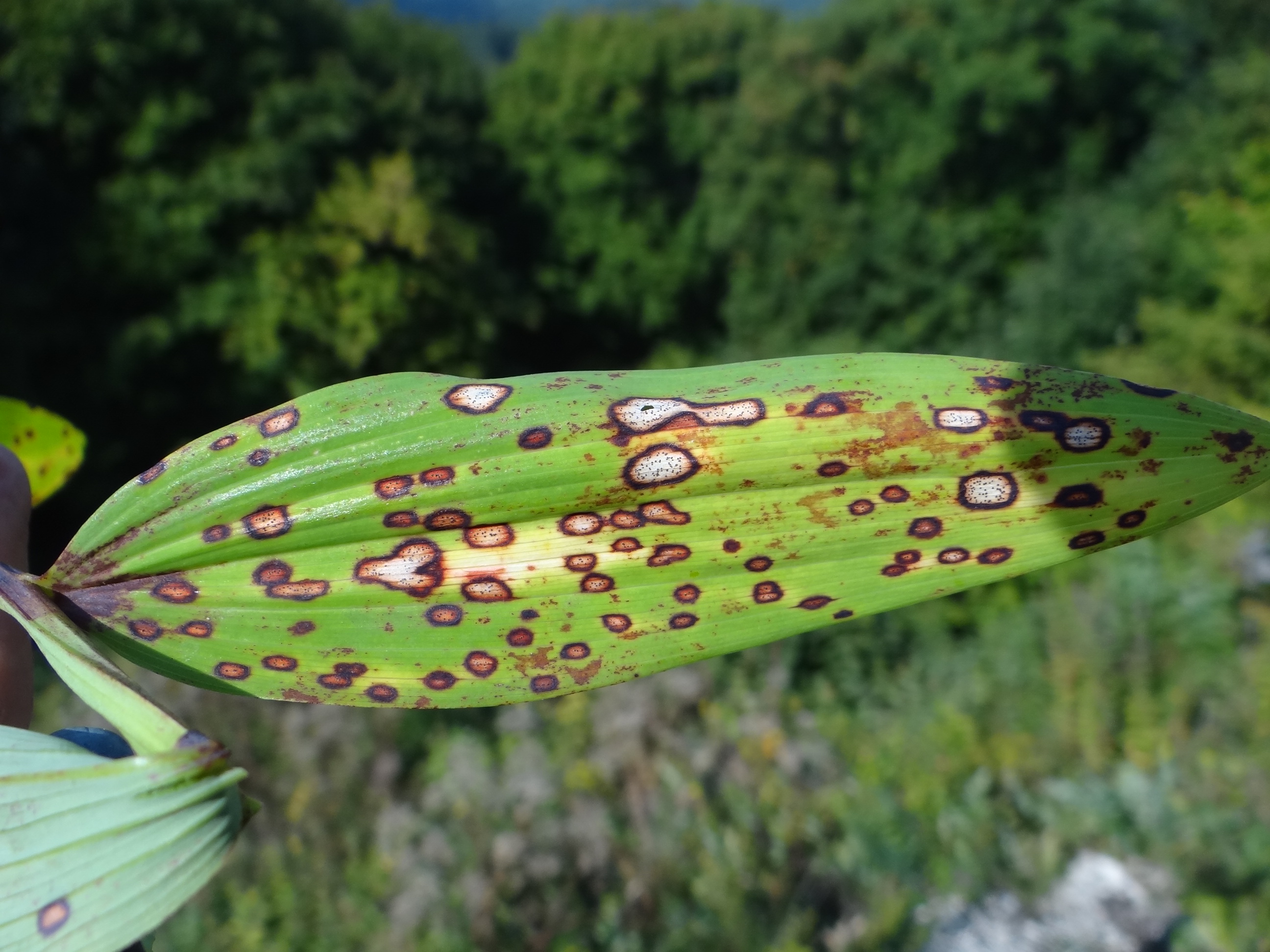
- Phyllosticta cruenta on leaf of Polygonatum odoratum

Scientific classification
- Kingdom: Fungi
- Division: Ascomycota
- Class: Dothideomycetes
- Subclass: incertae sedis
- Order: Botryosphaeriales; C.L. Schoch, Crous & Shoemaker (2006)

= Botryosphaeriales =

Order of fungi

The Botryosphaeriales are an order of sac fungi (Ascomycetes), placed under class Dothideomycetes. Some species are parasites, causing leaf spot, plant rot, die-back or cankers, but they can also be saprophytes or endophytes. They occur world-wide on many hosts. For example, in China, infections related to Botryosphaeriales have been recorded on numerous hosts such as grapes, Caragana arborescens,Cercis chinensis, Eucalyptus, Chinese hackberry, blueberry, forest trees, and various other woody hosts.

The order was originally defined in 2006 to have only one family, Botryosphaeriaceae, but new taxonomic studies have added at least seven other families. It was then reduced to just seven families in 2020.

== Families ==
As accepted by Wijayawardene et al. 2020;

- Aplosporellaceae (with genera Alanomyces and Aplosporella)
- Botryosphaeriaceae
- Endomelanconiopsidaceae
- Melanopsaceae (only holds Melanops)
- Phyllostictaceae (with genera Phyllosticta and Pseudofusicoccum)
- Planistromellaceae (with genera Kellermania and Umthunziomyces)
- Saccharataceae (with genera Pileospora, Saccharata and Septorioides)

=== Genera incertae sedis ===
A 2022 review and summary of fungal classification by Wijayawardene and colleagues placed the following genera as incertae sedis within Botryosphaeriales.

- Auerswaldiella Theiss. & Syd. (7 sp.)
- Coccostromella Petr. (1 sp.)
- Gibberidea (Fr.) Rabenh. (ca. 11 sp.)
- Mycosphaerellopsis Höhn. (2 sp.)
- Leptoguignardia E. Müll. (1 sp.)
- Metameris Theiss. & Syd. (5 sp.)
- Phyllachorella Syd. (8 sp.)
- Pilgeriella Henn. (2 sp.)
- Sivanesania W.H. Hsieh & Chi Y. Chen (1 sp.)
- Vestergrenia Rehm (3 sp.)
