= List of mango diseases =

Diseases of mangos (Mangifera indica) include:

== Bacterial diseases ==
Bacterial diseases
Bacterial black spot = bacterial canker	Xanthomonas campestris pv. mangiferaeindicae
Bacterial fruit rot	Pectobacterium carotovorum subsp. carotovorum = Erwinia carotovora subsp. carotovora Erwinia herbicola
Crown gall hi	Agrobacterium tumefaciens

== Fungal diseases ==
Fungal diseases
Alternaria leaf spots	Alternaria alternata Alternaria tenuissima
Anthracnose	Colletotrichum gloeosporioides Glomerella cingulata [teleomorph] Colletotrichum acutatum
Black banded disease	Rhinocladium corticum
Black mildew	Meliola mangiferae
Black mold rot	Aspergillus niger
Black rot	Ceratocystis paradoxa Chalara paradoxa [anamorph]
Blossom blight	Botrytis cinerea
Blue mold	Penicillium expansum
Branch canker	Botryosphaeria ribis Fusicoccum sp. [anamorph] Hypoxylon serpens var. effusum
Branch necrosis	Dothiorella sp.
Ceratocystis wilt	Ceratocystis fimbriata Chalara sp. [anamorph]
Charcoal fruit rot	Macrophomina phaseolina
Charcoal root rot	Macrophomina phaseolina
Crown rot	Fusarium solani Nectria haematococca [teleomorph]
Crusty leaf spot	Zimmermanniella trispora
Curvularia blight	Curvularia tuberculata
Dieback	Botryosphaeria disrupta = Physalospora disrupta Botryosphaeria quercuum = Physalospora glandicola Botryosphaeria rhodina = Physalospora rhodina Lasiodiplodia theobromae = Botryosphaeria theobromae
Felt fungus	Septobasidium bogoriense Septobasidium pilosum Johncouchia mangiferae [anamorph] Septobasidium pseudopedicellatum
Fruit rot	Alternaria alternata Phytophthora nicotianae Pestalotiopsis mangiferae Phyllosticta anacardiacearum Guignardia mangiferae [teleomorph]
Gall	Fusarium decemcellare Calonectria rigidiuscula [teleomorph]
Gray leaf spot	Pestalotiopsis mangiferae = Pestalotia mangiferae
Hendersonia rot	Hendersonia creberrima
Leaf blight	Bipolaris hawaiiensis
Leaf spot	Curvularia lunata Leptosphaeria sp. Macrophoma sp. Phaeosphaerella mangiferae Phoma sorghina Pseudocercospora mali Pseudocercospora subsessilis Septoria sp. Verticillium lecanii
Macrophoma rot	Macrophoma mangiferae
Mango malformation	Fusarium subglutinans (Note: some debate remains as to complete etiology of this disease.)
Mucor rot	Mucor circinelloides
Mushroom root rot	Armillaria tabescens
Phoma blight	Phoma glomerata
Phyllosticta leaf spot	Phyllosticta mortonii Phyllosticta citricarpa Guignardia citricarpa [teleomorph] Phyllosticta anacardiacearum Guignardia mangiferae [teleomorph]
Pink disease	Erythricium salmonicolor = Corticium salmonicolor Necator decretus [anamorph]
Powdery mildew	Erysiphe cichoracearum Oidium asteris-punicei [anamorph] Oidium mangiferae
Rhizopus rot	Rhizopus arrhizus = Rhizopus oryzae
Root rot	Cylindrocladiella peruviana = Cylindrocladium peruvianum Phymatotrichopsis omnivora Phytophthora nicotianae = Phytophthora nicotianae var. parasitica Phytophthora palmivora Pythium spp. Pythium splendens Rhizoctonia solani Thanatephorus cucumeris [teleomorph] Sclerotium rolfsii var. delphinii Sclerotium rolfsii
Scab	Elsinoe mangiferae Sphaceloma mangiferae [anamorph]
Sclerotinia rot	Sclerotinia sclerotiorum
Seed rots	Bipolaris ravenelii Marasmius sp. Pythium spp. Rhizoctonia solani
Shoestring rot	Armillaria mellea
Sooty blotch	Gloeodes pomigena
Sooty molds	Capnodium citri Capnodium mangiferae Capnodium ramosum Meliola spp. Tripospermum acerinum
Stem canker	Phoma sp.
Stem end rot	Botryosphaeria rhodina Dothiorella dominicana = Fusicoccum aesculi Botryosphaeria dothidea [teleomorph] Hendersonula toruloidea Lasiodiplodia theobromae = Botryodiplodia theobromae Phomopsis mangiferae
Stem gall	Sphaeropsis sp.
Stemphylium rot	Stemphylium vesicarium
Stigmina leaf spot	Stigmina mangiferae
Tip dieback	Fusarium equiseti Gibberella intricans [teleomorph]
Transit rot	Rhizopus stolonifer
Trunk rot	Hexagonia hydnoides = Polyporus hydnoides
Twig blight	Diaporthe spp.
Verticillium wilt	Verticillium albo-atrum
White sooty blotch	Gloeodes sp.
Wood rot	Ganoderma applanatum Ganoderma lucidum Phellinus gilvus Pycnoporus sanguineus = Polyporus sanguineus

== Nematodes, parasitic ==
Nematodes, parasitic
Dagger nematode	Xiphinema brevicolle Xiphinema spp.
Lance nematode	Hoplolaimus columbus
Sheathoid nematode	Hemicriconemoides mangiferae

== Miscellaneous diseases and disorders ==
Miscellaneous diseases and disorders
Abnormal ripening	Incorrect O_{2}:CO_{2} ratios in storage or fruit waxing.
Algal leaf spot = red rust	Cephaleuros virescens Kunze
Black tip	Post-harvest disorder of unknown cause
Brushing damage	Excessive post-harvest brush polishing of fruit
Bunchy top	Unknown cause
Chilling injury	Temperatures from 7-13 °C; cultivar dependent.
Copper deficiency	Unavailable copper
Decline	Unknown etiology
Edema	Physiological water stress
Hot water scald	Excessive temperature or duration in hot water or hot water/fungicide dips
Impact damage	Fruit injury from mishandling during harvest or grading
Internal necrosis	Boron deficiency
Jelly seed	Unknown post-harvest disorder
Lenticel spotting	Heavy rains or prolonged post-harvest dips
Little leaf	Zinc deficiency
Manganese deficiency	Insufficient manganese
Parasitic lichen	Strigula elegans (Fee) Muell Arg.
Premature ripening	Cause of disorder unknown
Pressure damage	Surface fruit injury due to poor packing or load shift in transit
Sapburn injury	Sap contact with fruit skin during or post-harvest
Soft nose	Excessive nitrogen/low calcium levels
Spongy tissue	Unknown post-harvest disorder
Stem end cavity	Unexplained pre-harvest fruit injury
Sunburn	Sudden exposure of fruit to high air temperature and/or bright light
Tipburn	High soluble salts
