= List of Septobasidium species =

This is a list of binomial names in the fungi genus Septobasidium Pat (in the family of Septobasidiaceae), with just accepted species and not including synonyms.

'Outline of Fungi and fungus-like taxa' lists up to 200 species (in 2020), and 227 records are listed by Species Fungorum;

A list of former Septobasidium species is at the end.

== A ==
- Septobasidium abnorme (Henn.) Höhn. & Litsch. (1907)
- Septobasidium acaciae Sawada (1911)
- Septobasidium accumbens (Berk. & Broome) Bres. (1938)
- Septobasidium alatum Lloyd (1919)
- Septobasidium albiziae S.Z. Chen & L. Guo (2011)
- Septobasidium aligerum Petch (1927)
- Septobasidium alni Torrend (1913)
- Septobasidium alopecinum (Berk. & Broome) Petch (1925)
- Septobasidium alveomarginatum Couch ex L.D. Gómez & Henk (2004)
- Septobasidium annulatum C.X. Lu & L. Guo (2009)
- Septobasidium apiculatum Couch ex L.D. Gómez & Henk (2004)
- Septobasidium aquilariae C.L. Zhao (2019)
- Septobasidium arachnoideum (Berk. & Broome) Bres. (1916)
- Septobasidium arboreum (Couch) Boedijn & B.A. Steinm. (1931)
- Septobasidium ardisiae C.X. Lu & L. Guo (2009)
- Septobasidium areolatum Couch (1929)
- Septobasidium atalantiae S.Z. Chen & L. Guo (2011)
- Septobasidium atratum Pat. (1900)
- Septobasidium atropunctum Couch (1929)
- Septobasidium aulacaspidis C.X. Lu & L. Guo (2010)

== B ==
- Septobasidium bagliettoanum (Fr.) Bres. (1905)
- Septobasidium bakeri Pat. (1914)
- Septobasidium boedijnii Couch ex L.D. Gómez & Henk (2004)
- Septobasidium bogoriense Pat. (1899)
- Septobasidium bresadolae Sacc. & P. Syd. (1902)
- Septobasidium broussonetiae C.X. Lu, L. Guo & J.G. Wei (2010)
- Septobasidium brunneum Wei Li bis & L. Guo (2014)
- Septobasidium burtii Lloyd (1924)

== C ==
- Septobasidium cabralii Torrend (1913)
- Septobasidium canescens Burt (1916)
- Septobasidium capparis S.Z. Chen & L. Guo (2012)
- Septobasidium carbonaceum Pat. (1920)
- Septobasidium carestianum Bres. (1897)
- Septobasidium castaneum Burt (1916)
- Septobasidium cavarae Bres. (1905)
- Septobasidium caveniae Marchion. (1941)
- Septobasidium cervicolor Couch ex L.D. Gómez & Henk (2004)
- Septobasidium cinchonae Racib. (1909)
- Septobasidium cinereum Couch ex L.D. Gómez & Henk (2004)
- Septobasidium cinnabarinum Syd. & P. Syd. (1914)
- Septobasidium cinnamomeum Burt (1926)
- Septobasidium cirratum Burt (1916)
- Septobasidium clavulatum W. Yamam. (1956)
- Septobasidium clelandii Couch ex L.D. Gómez & Henk (2004)
- Septobasidium clethrae Couch ex L.D. Gómez & Henk (2004)
- Septobasidium coffeicola Henn. (1906)
- Septobasidium cokeri Couch (2019)
- Septobasidium conidiophorum Couch ex L.D. Gómez & Henk (2004)
- Septobasidium cotoneastri S.Z. Chen & L. Guo (2013)
- Septobasidium couchii Donk (1958)
- Septobasidium cremeum Couch ex L.D. Gómez & Henk (2004)
- Septobasidium crinitum (Fr.) Lloyd (1917)
- Septobasidium crustaceum Couch ex L.D. Gómez & Henk (2004)
- Septobasidium cupressi Couch ex L.D. Gómez & Henk (2004)
- Septobasidium curtisii (Berk. & Desm.) Boedijn & B.A. Steinm. (1931)

== D ==
- Septobasidium dacrydii S.Z. Chen & L. Guo (2012)
- Septobasidium diaspidioti Wei Li bis & L. Guo (2013)
- Septobasidium dictyodes (Berk. & Broome) Pat. (1908)

== E ==
- Septobasidium elaeagni S.Z. Chen & L. Guo (2012)
- Septobasidium elatostematis Couch ex L.D. Gómez & Henk (2004)
- Septobasidium euonymi S.Z. Chen & L. Guo (2013)
- Septobasidium euryae-groffii C.X. Lu & L. Guo (2010)

== F ==
- Septobasidium ficicola Couch ex L.D. Gómez & Henk (2004)
- Septobasidium filiforme Couch ex L.D. Gómez & Henk (2004)
- Septobasidium fissolobatum (Henn.) Lloyd (1917)
- Septobasidium fissuratum Wei Li bis & L. Guo (2013)
- Septobasidium flavobrunneum Boedijn & B.A. Steinm. (1930)
- Septobasidium foliicola Torrend (1913)
- Septobasidium formosense Couch ex L.D. Gómez & Henk (2004)
- Septobasidium fragile Couch ex L.D. Gómez & Henk (2004)
- Septobasidium fraxini Couch (2019)
- Septobasidium fumigatum Burt (1916)
- Septobasidium fuscocinereum Couch ex L.D. Gómez & Henk (2004)
- Septobasidium fuscoviolaceum Bres. (1903)
- Septobasidium fuscum Couch ex L.D. Gómez & Henk (2004)

== G ==
- Septobasidium galziniie Bourdot (1922)
- Septobasidium gaoligongense C.X. Lu & L. Guo (2010)
- Septobasidium glycosmidise S.Z. Chen & L. Guo (2011)
- Septobasidium gomeziie Henk (2005)
- Septobasidium grandispinosume Couch ex L.D. Gómez & Henk (2004)
- Septobasidium grandisporume Couch ex L.D. Gómez & Henk (2004)
- Septobasidium granulosume Syd. & P. Syd. (1917)
- Septobasidium griseopurpureume Couch ex L.D. Gómez & Henk (2004)
- Septobasidium griseume Couch ex L.D. Gómez & Henk (2004)
- Septobasidium guangxiensee Wei Li bis & L. Guo (2014)
- Septobasidium guaraniticume Marchion. (1941)

== H ==
- Septobasidium hainanense C.X. Lu & L. Guo (2011)
- Septobasidium hakgalanum Couch & Petch ex L.D. Gómez & Henk (2004)
- Septobasidium heliciae Wei Li bis & L. Guo (2013)
- Septobasidium hesleri Couch ex L.D. Gómez & Henk (2004)
- Septobasidium heveae Couch ex L.D. Gómez & Henk (2004)
- Septobasidium hoveniae Wei Li bis, S.Z. Chen, L. Guo & Yao Q. Ye (2013)
- Septobasidium humile Racib. (1909)
- Septobasidium hydrangeae S.Z. Chen & L. Guo (2012)

== I/J/K ==
- Septobasidium indigophorum Couch ex L.D. Gómez & Henk (2004)
- Septobasidium irregulare Couch ex L.D. Gómez & Henk (2004)
- Septobasidium jamaicaense Burt (1916)
- Septobasidium kameii Kaz. Itô (1961)
- Septobasidium kupemontis (P. Roberts) P. Roberts (2008)

== L ==
- Septobasidium lacunosum Couch ex L.D. Gómez & Henk (2004)
- Septobasidium lagerheimii Couch ex L.D. Gómez & Henk (2004)
- Septobasidium lanatum C.H. Chow (1932)
- Septobasidium langloisii Pat. (1900)
- Septobasidium lanosum Pat. (1924)
- Septobasidium laxum Pat. (1915)
- Septobasidium lepidosaphis Couch ex L.D. Gómez & Henk (2004)
- Septobasidium leprieurii (Mont.) Pat. (1900)
- Septobasidium leprosum Couch ex L.D. Gómez & Henk (2004)
- Septobasidium leucostemum Pat. (1920)
- Septobasidium ligustri C.X. Lu & L. Guo (2011)
- Septobasidium lilacinoalbum Couch (2019)
- Septobasidium lilacinum Burt (1916)
- Septobasidium linderi Couch ex L.D. Gómez & Henk (2004)
- Septobasidium lyoniae C.X. Lu & L. Guo (2011)

== M ==
- Septobasidium macadamiae Couch ex L.D. Gómez & Henk (2004)
- Septobasidium maesae C.X. Lu & L. Guo (2009)
- Septobasidium makilingianum Syd. & P. Syd. (1917)
- Septobasidium marianiae Bres. (1905)
- Septobasidium meizhouense C.X. Lu, L. Guo & J.B. Li (2010)
- Septobasidium meredithiae Henk (2005)
- Septobasidium meridionale C.X. Lu & L. Guo (2010)
- Septobasidium merrillii Bres. (1915)
- Septobasidium mexicanum Syd. & P. Syd. (1921)
- Septobasidium michelianum (Caldesi) Pat. (1900)
- Septobasidium minutulum Syd. & P. Syd. (1914)
- Septobasidium miyakei W. Yamam. (1956)
- Septobasidium molle Couch ex L.D. Gómez & Henk (2004)
- Septobasidium molliusculum Syd. & P. Syd. (1913)
- Septobasidium muelleri Couch ex L.D. Gómez & Henk (2004)
- Septobasidium murinum (Berk. & Broome) Petch (1925)
- Septobasidium myrsinae Couch ex L.D. Gómez & Henk (2004)

== N/O ==
- Septobasidium natalense Couch ex L.D. Gómez & Henk (2004)
- Septobasidium neglectum Boedijn & B.A. Steinm. (1931)
- Septobasidium nigrum W. Yamam. (1956)
- Septobasidium nodulosum Pat. (1915)
- Septobasidium obscurum Boedijn & B.A. Steinm. (1931)
- Septobasidium orbiculare (Durieu & Lév.) Donk (1966)

== P ==
- Septobasidium pachydermum Couch ex L.D. Gómez & Henk (2004)
- Septobasidium pallidum Couch ex L.D. Gómez & Henk (2004)
- Septobasidium pannosum (Fr.) Bres. (1916)
- Septobasidium parlatoriae Sawada (1931)
- Septobasidium parviflorae Masuya & T. Yamada (2007)
- Septobasidium patouillardii Burt (1916)
- Septobasidium paulense Henn. (1904)
- Septobasidium peckii Couch ex L.D. Gómez & Henk (2004)
- Septobasidium pedicellatum (Schwein.) Pat. (1892)
- Septobasidium perforatum Couch ex L.D. Gómez & Henk (2004)
- Septobasidium petchii Couch ex L.D. Gómez & Henk (2004)
- Septobasidium philippinense Couch ex L.D. Gómez & Henk (2004)
- Septobasidium phyllophilum Syd. & P. Syd. (1914)
- Septobasidium pilosum Boedijn & B.A. Steinm. (1930)
- Septobasidium pinicola Snell (1922)
- Septobasidium piperis Couch ex L.D. Gómez & Henk (2004)
- Septobasidium pittospori C.X. Lu & L. Guo (2011)
- Septobasidium planum Boedijn (1959)
- Septobasidium polygoni C.X. Lu & L. Guo (2010)
- Septobasidium proliferum Boedijn & B.A. Steinm. (1931)
- Septobasidium prosopidicola Speg. (1926)
- Septobasidium protractum Syd. & P. Syd. (1912)
- Septobasidium pruni C.X. Lu & L. Guo (2009)
- Septobasidium prunophilum Couch ex L.D. Gómez & Henk (2004)
- Septobasidium pseudopedicellatum Burt (1916)
- Septobasidium pteruloides (Mont.) Lloyd (1917)
- Septobasidium punctatum Couch ex L.D. Gómez & Henk (2004)
- Septobasidium purpureum Couch (1929)

== Q/R ==
- Septobasidium quercinum (De Not. & Bagl.) Sacc. (1916)
- Septobasidium ramorum (Schwein.) Donk (1958)
- Septobasidium reevesiae S.Z. Chen & L. Guo (2012)
- Septobasidium reinkingii Couch ex L.D. Gómez & Henk (2004)
- Septobasidium reticulatum (Berk. & Broome) Pat. (1908)
- Septobasidium retiforme (Berk. & M.A. Curtis) Pat. (1900)
- Septobasidium rhabarbarinum (Mont.) Bres. (1916)
- Septobasidium rickii Couch ex L.D. Gómez & Henk (2004)
- Septobasidium rimulosum Petch & Couch ex L.D. Gómez & Henk (2004)
- Septobasidium robustum Boedijn & B.A. Steinm. (1931)
- Septobasidium rugulosum Couch ex L.D. Gómez & Henk (2004)

== S ==
- Septobasidium sabal Couch ex L.D. Gómez & Henk (2004)
- Septobasidium sabal-minor Couch ex L.D. Gómez & Henk (2004)
- Septobasidium saccardoanum (Rangel) Marchion. (1938)
- Septobasidium saurauiae S.Z. Chen & L. Guo (2011)
- Septobasidium scabiosum Couch & Petch ex L.D. Gómez & Henk (2004)
- Septobasidium schizostachyi Couch ex L.D. Gómez & Henk (2004)
- Septobasidium sclerotioides Couch ex L.D. Gómez & Henk (2004)
- Septobasidium scopiforme Pat. (1907)
- Septobasidium separans Couch ex L.D. Gómez & Henk (2004)
- Septobasidium septobasidioides (Henn.) Höhn. & Litsch. (1907)
- Septobasidium sichuanense S.Z. Chen & L. Guo (2011)
- Septobasidium simmondsii Couch ex L.D. Gómez & Henk (2004)
- Septobasidium sinense Couch ex L.D. Gómez & Henk (2004)
- Septobasidium sinuosum Couch ex L.D. Gómez & Henk (2004)
- Septobasidium siparium (Berk. & M.A. Curtis) Bres. (1920)
- Septobasidium soleare Couch (2019)
- Septobasidium spiniferum Burt (1926)
- Septobasidium spongium (Berk. & M.A. Curtis) Pat. (1900)
- Septobasidium stereoides Höhn. & Litsch. (1907)
- Septobasidium stevensonii Couch ex L.D. Gómez & Henk (2004)
- Septobasidium stratiferum Boedijn & B.A. Steinm. (1931)
- Septobasidium stratosum Couch ex L.D. Gómez & Henk (2004)
- Septobasidium subcarbonaceum (Berk. & Broome) Couch (1938)
- Septobasidium sublilacinum (Ellis & Everh.) Burt (1916)
- Septobasidium subolivaceum Syd. & P. Syd. (1914)
- Septobasidium suffultum (Berk. & Broome) Pat. (1908)
- Septobasidium sulphurellum Syd. & P. Syd. (1919)
- Septobasidium sydowii Couch ex L.D. Gómez & Henk (2004)
- Septobasidium symploci S.Z. Chen & L. Guo (2013)

== T ==
- Septobasidium tabacinum Bres. (1926)
- Septobasidium tambaense W. Yamam. (1956)
- Septobasidium tanakae (Miyabe) Boedijn & B.A. Steinm. (1931)
- Septobasidium taxodii Couch ex L.D. Gómez & Henk (2004)
- Septobasidium tenue Couch ex L.D. Gómez & Henk (2004)
- Septobasidium theae Boedijn & B.A. Steinm. (1931)
- Septobasidium thwaitesii (Berk. & Broome) Pat. (1925)
- Septobasidium tigrinum Boedijn & B.A. Steinm. (1930)
- Septobasidium tjibodense Boedijn & B.A. Steinm. (1931)
- Septobasidium tomentosum Couch ex L.D. Gómez & Henk (2004)
- Septobasidium transversum Wei Li bis & L. Guo (2014)
- Septobasidium triviale Boedijn & B.A. Steinm. (1931)
- Septobasidium tropicale Burt (1916)
- Septobasidium tuberculatum Boedijn & B.A. Steinm. (1930)

== U/V/W ==
- Septobasidium ugandae Couch ex L.D. Gómez & Henk (2004)
- Septobasidium ussanguense (Henn.) Lloyd (1917)
- Septobasidium velutinum Pat. (1892)
- Septobasidium verrucosum Couch ex L.D. Gómez & Henk (2004)
- Septobasidium westonii Couch ex L.D. Gómez & Henk (2004)
- Septobasidium wilsonianum L.D. Gómez & Kisim.-Hor. (2001)
- Septobasidium yunnanense S.Z. Chen & L. Guo (2012)

== Former species ==
As of 2023;

- S. album Burt (1926) = Saccosoma album, Phleogenaceae
- S. alni var. brasiliense Couch (1938) = Septobasidium alni
- S. alni var. brasiliense Couch ex L.D. Gómez & Henk (2004) = Septobasidium alni
- S. alni var. squamosum Couch (1935) = Septobasidium alni
- S. alni var. squamosum Couch ex L.D. Gómez & Henk (2004) = Septobasidium alni
- S. burtii var. acerinum Couch (1938) = Septobasidium burtii
- S. burtii var. acerinum Couch ex L.D. Gómez & Henk (2004) = Septobasidium burtii
- S. caespitulosum Bres. (1926) = Helicobasidium killermannii, Helicobasidiaceae
- S. carestianum var. natalense Couch (1938) = Septobasidium carestianum
- S. carestianum var. natalense Couch ex L.D. Gómez & Henk (2004) = Septobasidium carestianum
- S. castaneum var. draconianum Viégas (1940) = Septobasidium castaneum
- S. citricola Sawada (1933) = Jola orthosacca, Eocronartiaceae
- S. cladoderris Lloyd (1924) = Tuberculina argillacea, Helicobasidiaceae
- S. coccidiophagum (Couch) Wojewoda (1981) = Uredinella coccidiophaga
- S. compactum Boedijn (1926) = Helicobasidium longisporum, Helicobasidiaceae
- S. frustulosum (Berk. & M.A. Curtis) Pat. (1894) = Septobasidium rhabarbarinum
- S. frustulosum var. crassum Pat. (1897) = Septobasidium rhabarbarinum
- S. gossypinum Pat. (1925) = Atrichophyton albiciscans, Onygenaceae
- S. marianiae var. japonicum Couch (1938) = Septobasidium marianiae
- S. marianiae var. japonicum Couch ex L.D. Gómez & Henk (2004) = Septobasidium marianiae
- S. michelianum f. alni Pat. ex Sacc. (1912) = Septobasidium michelianum
- S. michelianum f. carestianum Pat. ex Sacc. (1912) = Septobasidium michelianum
- S. michelianum f. cavarae Pat. ex Sacc. (1912) = Septobasidium michelianum
- S. michelianum f. ceratoniae Pat. ex Sacc. (1912) = Septobasidium michelianum
- S. michelianum f. oleae Bres. (1913) = Septobasidium michelianum
- S. michelianum f. phillyreae Pat. ex Sacc. (1912) = Septobasidium michelianum
- S. mompa (Nobuj. Tanaka) Racib. (1909) = Helicobasidium mompa, Helicobasidiaceae
- S. mompa f. macrosporum Hara (1917) = Helicobasidium mompa, Helicobasidiaceae
- S. papyraceum Couch (1929) = Septobasidium septobasidioides
- S. polypodii Couch (1929) = Platycarpa polypodii, Eocronartiaceae
- S. radiosum Henn. ex Lloyd (1917) = Septobasidium rhabarbarinum
- S. rameale (Berk. & Broome) Bres. (1915) = Septobasidium pteruloides
- S. schweinitzii Burt (1916) = Septobasidium pedicellatum
- S. spinulosum (Couch & Petch) Wojewoda (1981) = Uredinella spinulosa
