= Septobasidium polygoni =

Scientific classification
- Domain: Eukaryota
- Kingdom: Fungi
- Division: Basidiomycota
- Class: Pucciniomycetes
- Order: Septobasidiales
- Family: Septobasidiaceae
- Genus: Septobasidium
- Species: S. polygoni

Binomial name
- Septobasidium polygoni Lu & Guo (2010)

Species of fungus

Septobasidium polygoni is a plant pathogenic fungus in the genus Septobasidium. It was first isolated from Koenigia campanulata.
