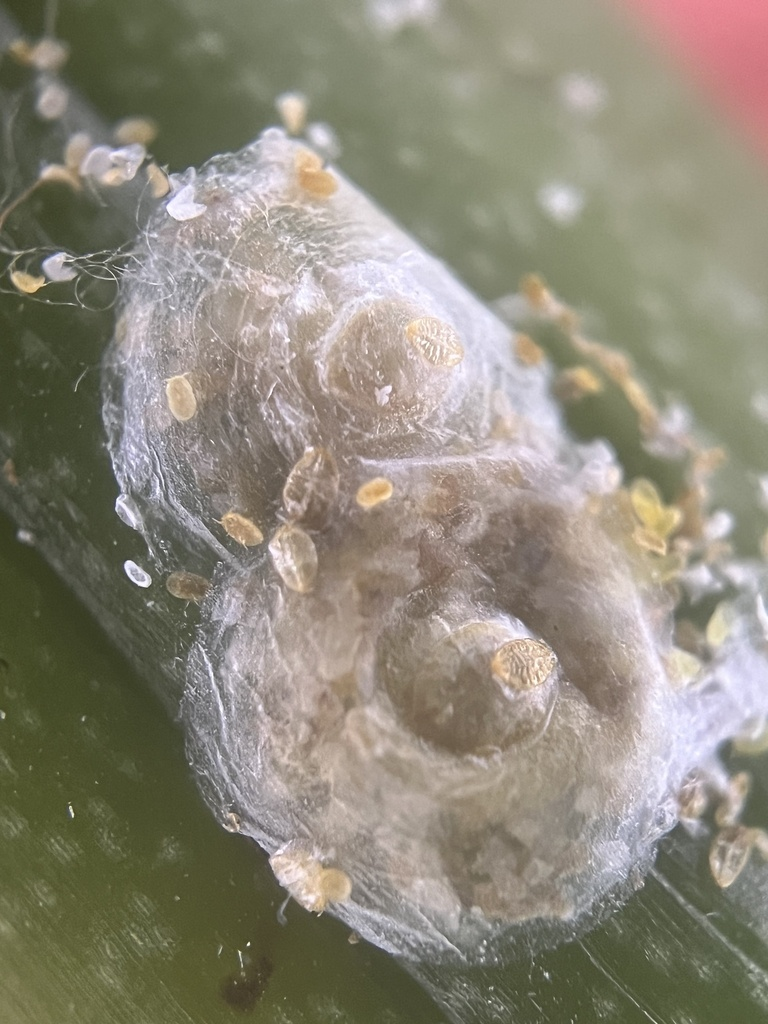
- Hemiberlesia cyanophylli found on a dying parlor palm

Scientific classification
- Kingdom: Animalia
- Phylum: Arthropoda
- Class: Insecta
- Order: Hemiptera
- Suborder: Sternorrhyncha
- Family: Diaspididae
- Genus: Hemiberlesia
- Species: H. cyanophylli

Binomial name
- Hemiberlesia cyanophylli Signoret, 1869

= Hemiberlesia cyanophylli =

Species of scale insect

Hemiberlesia cyanophylli, commonly known as the cyanophyllum scale, is a species of scale insect in the genus Hemiberlesia. This species causes problems for houseplants in North America. Most of the records have been found on the west coast, on house plants.

Hemiberlesia cyanophylli is yellowish scale insect, with a circular shell. There is usually an indent along the middle. This insect is 1-2 mm long and almost flat. Babies are small and yellow ridged ovals.
