= Xiphinema brevicolle =

Scientific classification
- Domain: Eukaryota
- Kingdom: Animalia
- Phylum: Nematoda
- Class: Enoplea
- Order: Dorylaimida
- Family: Longidoridae
- Genus: Xiphinema
- Species: X. brevicolle

Binomial name
- Xiphinema brevicolle Lordello & Da Costa, 1961

Species of nematode

Xiphinema brevicolle is a plant pathogenic nematode infecting mangoes.

== See also ==
- List of mango diseases
