= Phaeosphaerella mangiferae =

Scientific classification
- Kingdom: Fungi
- Division: Ascomycota
- Class: Dothideomycetes
- Order: Venturiales
- Family: Venturiaceae
- Genus: Phaeosphaerella
- Species: P. mangiferae

Binomial name
- Phaeosphaerella mangiferae F. Stevens & Weedon, (1925)

Species of fungus

Phaeosphaerella mangiferae is a plant pathogen affecting mangoes.

== See also ==
- List of mango diseases
