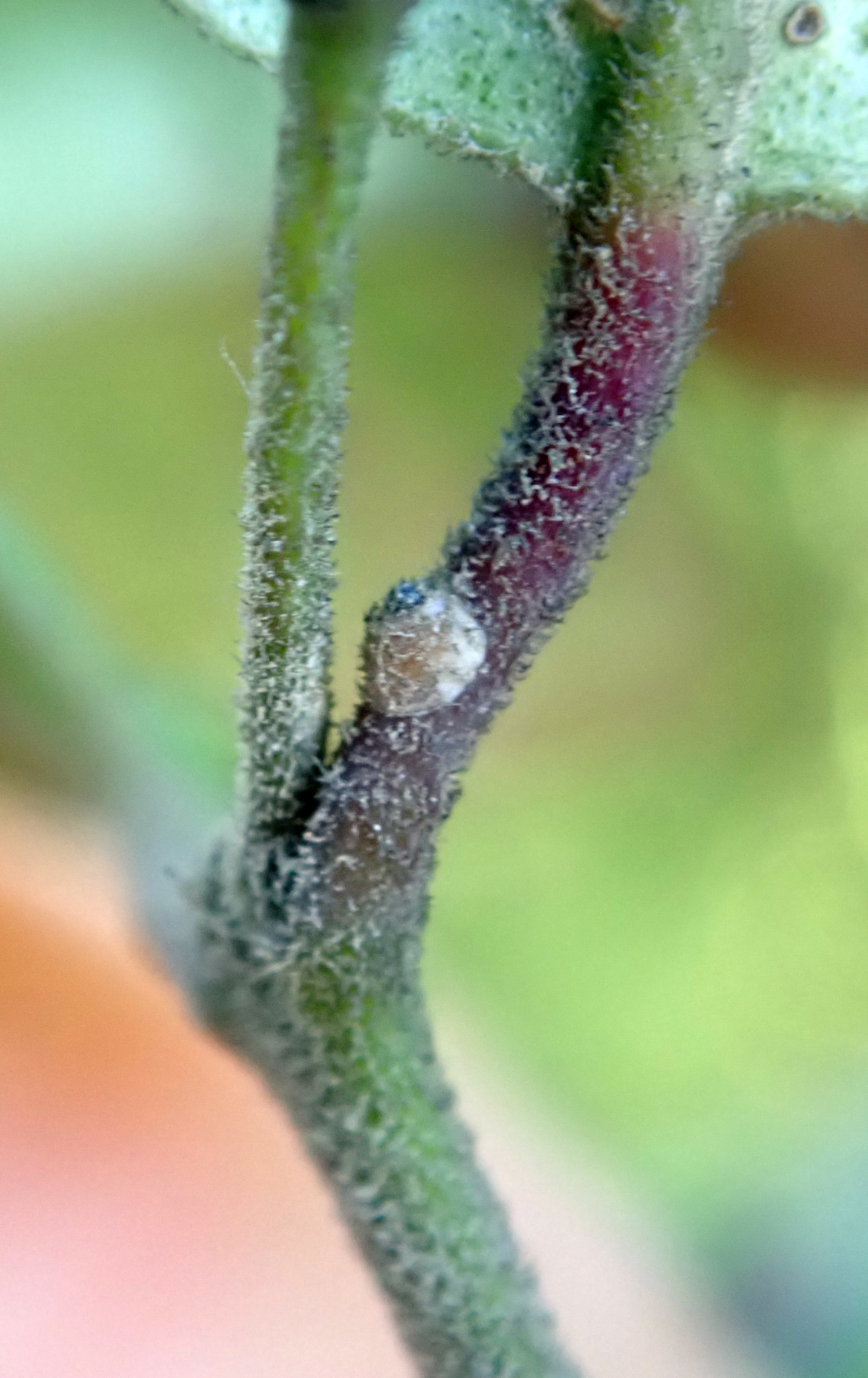
- Hemiberlesia lataniae, New Zealand

Scientific classification
- Domain: Eukaryota
- Kingdom: Animalia
- Phylum: Arthropoda
- Class: Insecta
- Order: Hemiptera
- Suborder: Sternorrhyncha
- Family: Diaspididae
- Genus: Hemiberlesia
- Species: H. lataniae

Binomial name
- Hemiberlesia lataniae (Signoret, 1869)

= Hemiberlesia lataniae =

Species of true bug

Hemiberlesia lataniae, the latania or palm scale, is a species of armored scale insect in the family Diaspididae. It was first described by the French entomologist Victor Antoine Signoret in 1869 using Latania lontaroides, a species of palm tree endemic to Réunion as its host; since then, it has been found on avocado trees growing in South Africa, Australia, Israel, the United States, and on a range of other plants in many parts of the world.

== Description ==
Scale insects have a domed, waxy covering which protects the soft-bodied insect below. Armored scales retain the exuviae (shed cuticles) from the first one or two nymphal stages, and sometimes faecal matter and fragments of the host plant, incorporating these into a hard, protective cover. The adult female palm scale has no wings or legs and is somewhat variable in appearance depending on where it is living; if feeding on leaves, the scale cover is circular and convex, and its colour tends to be greyish-white, while on twigs, branches and fruits, the cover is usually brownish and only moderately convex. The exuviae are yellowish-brown and are a noticeable feature near the centre of the scale. Male scale covers are oval, and adult males are small insects with legs and a single pair of wings. They have no mouthparts and only live for a day or two.

== Distribution and hosts ==
The palm scale has a wide range of host plants and has a nearly cosmopolitan distribution, having spread around the world, mostly on ornamental plants. It is known to use members of at least 78 different plant families as hosts, particularly favouring Rosaceae, Arecaceae and Euphorbiaceae. It is a major pest of kiwifruit, citrus, coconut, Melia azedarach (chinaberry), avocado, guava and grape.

== Biology ==
In some parts of the world, only female insects are present, and they breed by parthenogenesis. The female scales insert their mouthparts into the host plant's vascular tissues and suck the sap. They have no legs and do not move about as adults. The yellow eggs are retained by the female under her scale and hatch after a few hours. The newly emerged nymphs crawl away and disperse, losing their legs at their first moult after about two weeks. The second nymphal stage lasts another two or three weeks before moulting to the adult stage.

The organism may have a mutualistic relationship with a fungus, Septobasidium, which can protect them from predators such as aphelinid wasps and lady beetles like Aphytis diaspidis and Chilocorus stigma, and overgrow the colony completely obscuring them from view entirely, but this may stunt the growth of scale insects infected by the fungus as a side effect.
