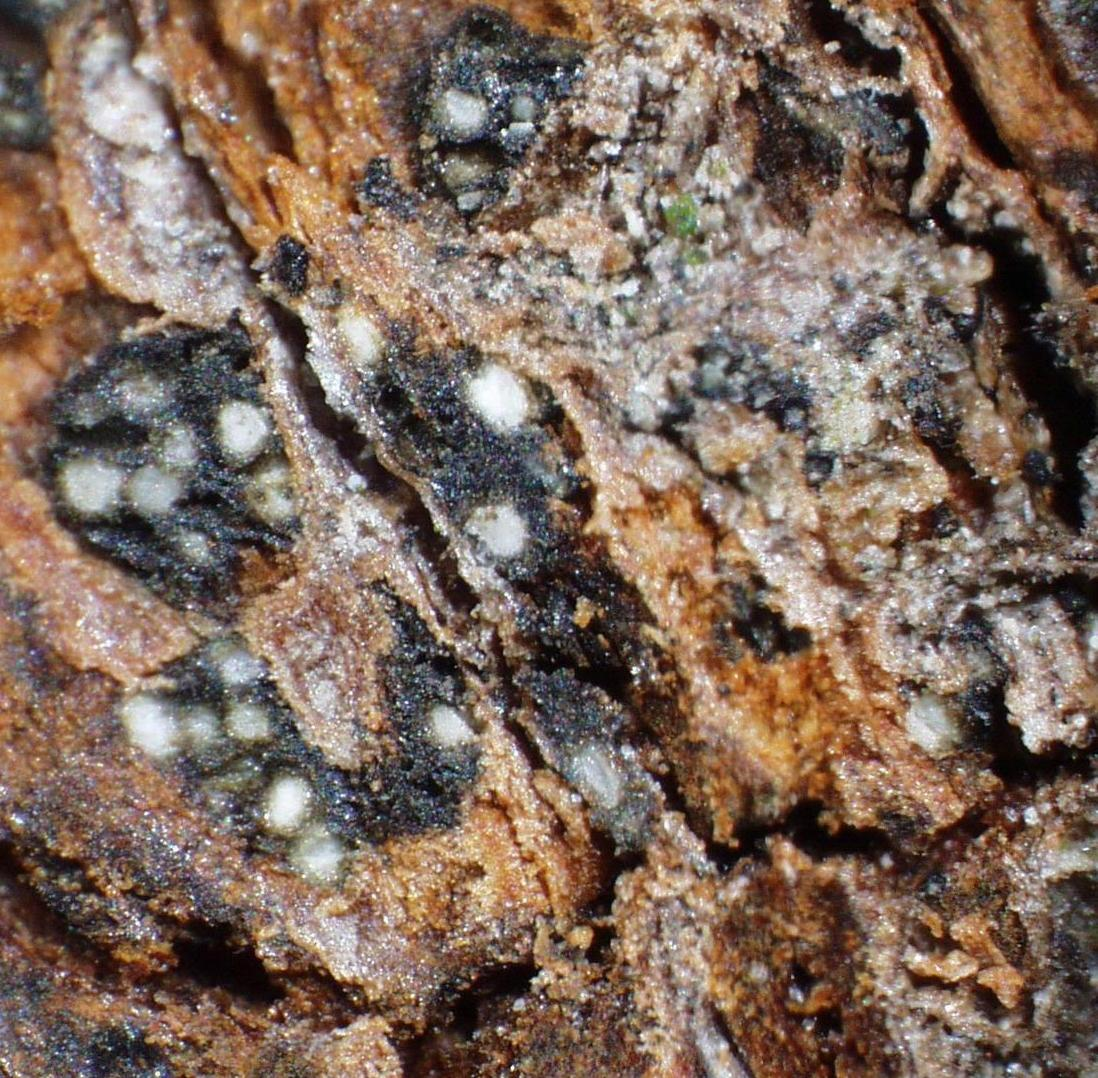
- Fruiting bodies of Botryosphaeria ribis, causal agent of Botryosphaeria canker on the host plant chokeberry

Scientific classification
- Kingdom: Fungi
- Division: Ascomycota
- Class: Dothideomycetes
- Order: Botryosphaeriales
- Family: Botryosphaeriaceae
- Genus: Botryosphaeria; Ces. & De Not. (1863)

Type species
- Botryosphaeria dothidea (Moug.) Ces. & De Not. (1863)

Species
- See text

Synonyms
- List: Acerbia (Sacc.) Sacc. & P.Syd. (1899); Apomella Syd. (1937); Botryophoma (P.Karst.) Höhn. (1916); Botryosphaerostroma Petr. & Syd. (1927); Botrysphaeris Clem. & Shear (1931); Catosphaeropsis Tehon (1939); Caumadothis Petr. (1971); Coleonaema Höhn. (1924); Coutinia J.V.Almeida & Sousa da Câmara (1903); Creomelanops Höhn. (1920); Cryptosphaeria Grev. (1822); Cylindroseptoria Quaedvl. (2013); Desmotascus F.Stevens (1919); Diplodia a Eudiplodia Sacc. (1880); Diplodia b Botryodiplodia Sacc. (1880); Dothiora Fr. (1849); Dothiora subgen. Metadothis Sacc. (1889); Dothiorella Sacc. (1880); Elmerococcum Theiss. & Syd. (1915); Epiphyma Theiss. (1916); Fusicoccum Corda (1829); Gibberidea Fuckel (1870); Gibberinula Kuntze (1898); Granulodiplodia Zambett. (1955); Gyratylium Preuss (1855); Holcomyces Lindau (1904); Jaapia Kirschst. (1938); Keisslerina Petr. (1920); Leptodothiora Höhn. (1918); Macrophoma (Sacc.) Berl. & Voglino (1886); Macrophomopsis Petr. (1924); Macroplodia Westend. (1857); Melanops Nitschke ex Fuckel (1870); Metadothis (Sacc.) Sacc. (1892); Naumovia Dobrozr. (1928); Neocylindroseptoria Thambug. & K.D.Hyde (2014); Neophaeocryptopus Wanas. (2016); Neosphaeropsis Petr. (1921); Ophioceras sect. Acerbia Sacc. (1895); Phaeobotryosphaeria Speg. (1908); Phoma subgen. Botryophoma P.Karst. (1884); Phoma subgen. Macrophoma Sacc. (1884); Phomatosphaeropsis Ribaldi (1953); Plowrightia Sacc. (1883); Pyreniella Theiss. (1916); Rosenscheldia Speg. (1885); Rostrosphaeria Tehon & E.Y.Daniels (1927); Sclerodothiorella Died. (1912); Sphaeropsis Sacc. (1880); Sphaeropsis Lév. (1842); Stigmea Bonord. (1864); Thuemenia Rehm (1878)

= Botryosphaeria =

Genus of fungi

Botryosphaeria is a genus of pathogenic fungi in the family Botryosphaeriaceae. There are 193 species, many of which are important disease-causing agents of various important agricultural crops.

== Species ==
- Botryosphaeria abietina
- Botryosphaeria abrupta
- Botryosphaeria abuensis
- Botryosphaeria acaciae
- Botryosphaeria agaves
- Botryosphaeria alibagensis
- Botryosphaeria anceps
- Botryosphaeria apocyni
- Botryosphaeria appendiculata
- Botryosphaeria araliae
- Botryosphaeria archontophoenicis
- Botryosphaeria arctostaphyli
- Botryosphaeria arundinariae
- Botryosphaeria arxii
- Botryosphaeria astrocaryi
- Botryosphaeria aterrima
- Botryosphaeria atrorufa
- Botryosphaeria bakeri
- Botryosphaeria berengeriana
- Botryosphaeria bondarzewii
- Botryosphaeria briosiana
- Botryosphaeria brunneispora
- Botryosphaeria buteae
- Botryosphaeria callicarpae
- Botryosphaeria calycanthi
- Botryosphaeria camarae
- Botryosphaeria cantareiensis
- Botryosphaeria carpini
- Botryosphaeria cassiicola
- Botryosphaeria catervaria
- Botryosphaeria cerasi
- Botryosphaeria chnaumatica
- Botryosphaeria cocogena
- Botryosphaeria cocoicola
- Botryosphaeria coffeae
- Botryosphaeria collematoides
- Botryosphaeria corticis
- Botryosphaeria corticola
- Botryosphaeria corynocarpi
- Botryosphaeria costai
- Botryosphaeria crataegi
- Botryosphaeria cruenta
- Botryosphaeria cunninghamiae
- Botryosphaeria cyanospora
- Botryosphaeria delilei
- Botryosphaeria diapensiae
- Botryosphaeria diplodioides
- Botryosphaeria dispersa
- Botryosphaeria disrupta
- Botryosphaeria dothidea
- Botryosphaeria effusa
- Botryosphaeria egenula
- Botryosphaeria elaeidis
- Botryosphaeria epichloë
- Botryosphaeria erythrinae
- Botryosphaeria escharoides
- Botryosphaeria eschweilerae
- Botryosphaeria eucalypticola
- Botryosphaeria eucalyptorum
- Botryosphaeria euphorbii
- Botryosphaeria faginea
- Botryosphaeria festucae
- Botryosphaeria ficina
- Botryosphaeria ficus
- Botryosphaeria flacca
- Botryosphaeria foliicola
- Botryosphaeria fourcroyae
- Botryosphaeria fuliginosa
- Botryosphaeria funtumiae
- Botryosphaeria galegae
- Botryosphaeria gaubae
- Botryosphaeria gleditschiae
- Botryosphaeria graphidea
- Botryosphaeria halimodendri
- Botryosphaeria hamamelidis
- Botryosphaeria hemidesmi
- Botryosphaeria heterochroma
- Botryosphaeria hiascens
- Botryosphaeria hibisci
- Botryosphaeria horizontalis
- Botryosphaeria hyperborea
- Botryosphaeria hypericorum
- Botryosphaeria hypoxyloidea
- Botryosphaeria hysterioides
- Botryosphaeria iberica
- Botryosphaeria imperspicua
- Botryosphaeria indica
- Botryosphaeria inflata
- Botryosphaeria ingae
- Botryosphaeria jasmini
- Botryosphaeria juglandina
- Botryosphaeria juglandis
- Botryosphaeria juniperi
- Botryosphaeria kumaonensis
- Botryosphaeria lagerheimii
- Botryosphaeria lanaris
- Botryosphaeria laricis
- Botryosphaeria liriodendri
- Botryosphaeria lutea
- Botryosphaeria majuscula
- Botryosphaeria malvacearum
- Botryosphaeria mamane
- Botryosphaeria mapaniae
- Botryosphaeria marconii
- Botryosphaeria mascarensis
- Botryosphaeria melachroa
- Botryosphaeria melanommoides
- Botryosphaeria melathroa
- Botryosphaeria meliae
- Botryosphaeria melioloides
- Botryosphaeria microspora
- Botryosphaeria minor
- Botryosphaeria minuscula
- Botryosphaeria mirabile
- Botryosphaeria molluginis
- Botryosphaeria mucosa
- Botryosphaeria muriculata
- Botryosphaeria mutila
- Botryosphaeria nephrodii
- Botryosphaeria nerii
- Botryosphaeria oblongula
- Botryosphaeria obtusa
- Botryosphaeria pachyspora
- Botryosphaeria parasitica
- Botryosphaeria parkinsoniae
- Botryosphaeria parva
- Botryosphaeria pasaniae
- Botryosphaeria pedrosensis
- Botryosphaeria persimon
- Botryosphaeria phormii
- Botryosphaeria phyllachoroidea
- Botryosphaeria piceae
- Botryosphaeria pinicola
- Botryosphaeria pipturi
- Botryosphaeria pittospori
- Botryosphaeria plicatula
- Botryosphaeria polita
- Botryosphaeria polycocca
- Botryosphaeria populi
- Botryosphaeria propullulans
- Botryosphaeria prosopidis
- Botryosphaeria prospidis
- Botryosphaeria protearum
- Botryosphaeria pruni
- Botryosphaeria prunicola
- Botryosphaeria pruni-spinosae
- Botryosphaeria pseudotsugae
- Botryosphaeria pseudotubulina
- Botryosphaeria purandharensis
- Botryosphaeria pustulata
- Botryosphaeria pyriospora
- Botryosphaeria quercuum
- Botryosphaeria rhizogena
- Botryosphaeria rhodina
- Botryosphaeria rhododendri
- Botryosphaeria rhododendricola
- Botryosphaeria ribis
- Botryosphaeria sacchari
- Botryosphaeria sarmentorum
- Botryosphaeria scharifii
- Botryosphaeria senegalensis
- Botryosphaeria simplex
- Botryosphaeria smilacinina
- Botryosphaeria sorosia
- Botryosphaeria spiraeae
- Botryosphaeria stevensii
- Botryosphaeria stomatica
- Botryosphaeria subconnata
- Botryosphaeria subtropica
- Botryosphaeria syconophila
- Botryosphaeria syringae
- Botryosphaeria tamaricis
- Botryosphaeria theicola
- Botryosphaeria tiampeana
- Botryosphaeria tiliacea
- Botryosphaeria tjampeana
- Botryosphaeria trabutiana
- Botryosphaeria trames
- Botryosphaeria tropicalis
- Botryosphaeria tsugae
- Botryosphaeria uleana
- Botryosphaeria uncariae
- Botryosphaeria vanillae
- Botryosphaeria vanvleckii
- Botryosphaeria venenata
- Botryosphaeria viburni
- Botryosphaeria viscosa
- Botryosphaeria vitis
- Botryosphaeria weigelae
- Botryosphaeria wisteriae
- Botryosphaeria xanthocephala
- Botryosphaeria xanthorrhoeae
- Botryosphaeria yedoensis
- Botryosphaeria zeae
