= Velvet blight =

Plant disease affecting tea plants

- Causal agents: Septobasidium bogoriense, S. pilosum and S. theae
- Hosts: tea
- EPPO Code: 1SEPBG

Velvet blight is a disease that affects the stems, branches, leaves, fruits or trunks of plants and trees. This disease is primarily caused by three fungal species from the genus Septobasidium: S. bogoriense, S. pilosum and S. theae.

It is known to affect mainly tea plants (genus Thea). The most studied of these species is S. bogoriense, most notably due to the work of Ernst Albert Gäumann. S. bogoriense is named after the Herbarium Bogoriense (Bogor, West Java, Indonesia) which is the place where it was first identified on the bark of an unspecified tree and named by E. Nyman on June 3, 1898. This species was also listed in Otto Warburg's Monsunia in 1900.

== Distribution ==
This disease is mainly found in tropical climates in Southern Asia, however some scattering exists:

=== S. bogoriense ===
- Java, Indonesia
- Sri Lanka
- Tonkin, China
- Japan
- North Queensland, Australia
- West Indies
- La Campana, Panama
- Northern Vietnam
- Washington, USA
- India

=== S. pilosum ===
- Java, Indonesia
- Taiwan
- Baton Rouge, Louisiana, USA
- Florida, USA

=== S. theae ===
- Java, Indonesia
- Lam dong, Viet Nam

== Known primary hosts ==
=== S. bogoriense ===
Coffea, Cinchona, Thea, Broussonetia, Morus, Citrus, Manihot, Ficus elastica, Solanum quitoense, Erythrina, Crotalaria sp., Tephrosia candida, Leucaena glauca, Sesbania aegyptiaca, Lantana, Stachytarpheta mutabilis, Paritium, Calosanthes indica, Fraxinus, Marsdenia, Piper nigrum, Polyosma, Rosa, Wigandia kunthii, Macaranga tanarius, Bougainvillea, Hibiscus rosa sub.sp. sinensis, and sub.sp. mangifera.

=== S. pilosum ===
Thea, Mangifera indica, Magnolia virginiana, and Artabotrys.

=== S. theae ===
Thea.
