= Botryosphaeria marconii =

Scientific classification
- Kingdom: Fungi
- Division: Ascomycota
- Class: Dothideomycetes
- Order: Botryosphaeriales
- Family: Botryosphaeriaceae
- Genus: Botryosphaeria
- Species: B. marconii

Binomial name
- Botryosphaeria marconii Charles & Jenkins (1914)

Species of fungus

Botryosphaeria marconii is a fungal plant pathogen that causes stalk and twig blight on hemp.
