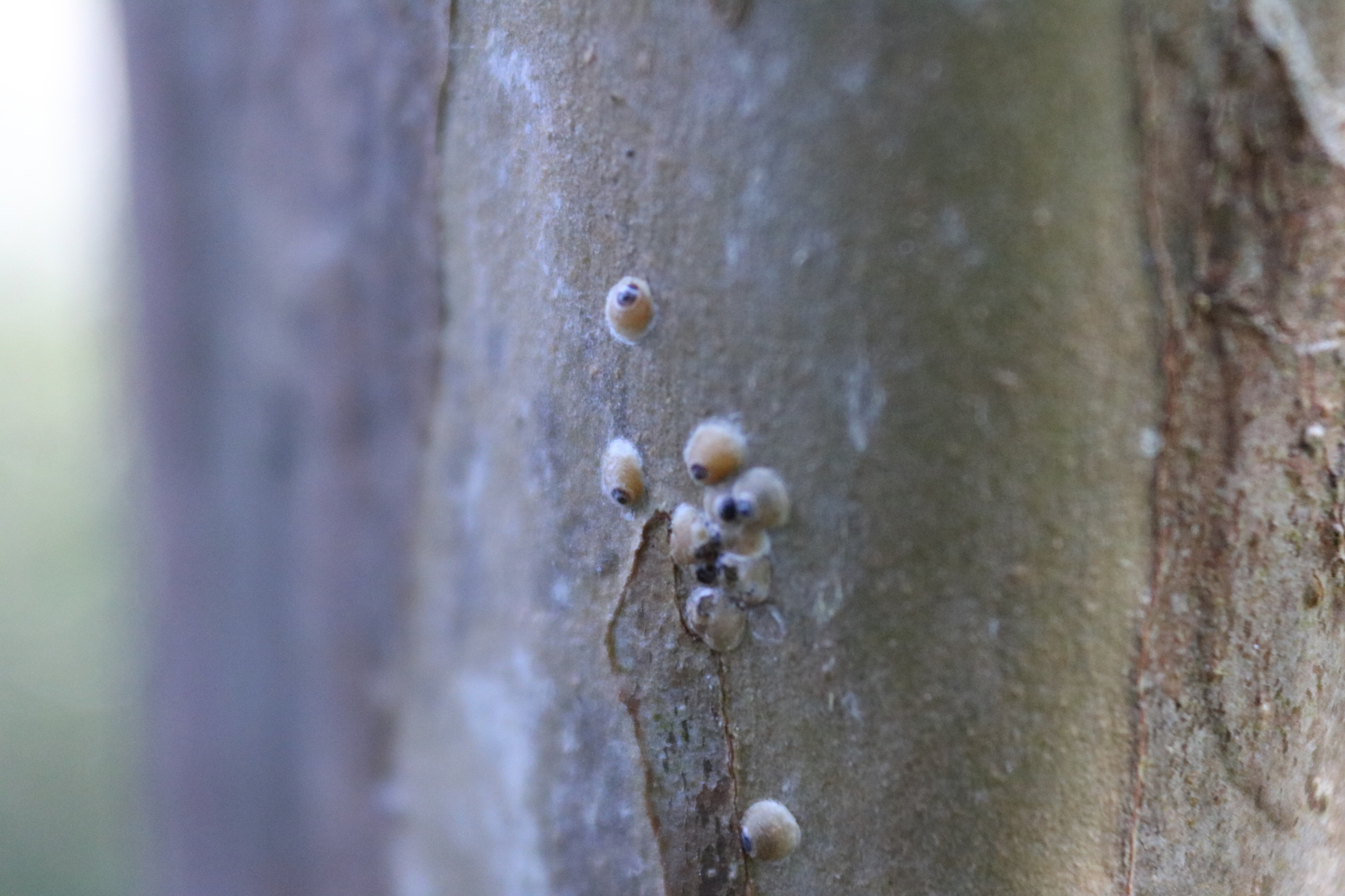
- Hemiberlesia rapax, New Zealand

Scientific classification
- Kingdom: Animalia
- Phylum: Arthropoda
- Class: Insecta
- Order: Hemiptera
- Suborder: Sternorrhyncha
- Family: Diaspididae
- Subfamily: Aspidiotinae
- Tribe: Aspidiotini
- Subtribe: Aspidiotina
- Genus: Hemiberlesia; Leonardi, 1897

Synonyms
- Hemiberlesea Lindinger, 1908

= Hemiberlesia =

Genus of scale insects

Hemiberlesia is a genus of armoured scales in the family Diaspididae. There are more than 50 described species in Hemiberlesia.

== Species ==
These 54 species belong to the genus Hemiberlesia:

- Hemiberlesia andradae Okusu & Normark, 2014
- Hemiberlesia camarana (Seabra, 1922)
- Hemiberlesia candidula (Cockerell, 1900)
- Hemiberlesia caricis (Gómez-Menor Ortega, 1954)
- Hemiberlesia chipponsanensis (Takahashi, 1935)
- Hemiberlesia colorata (Cockerell, 1893)
- Hemiberlesia corporifusca (Chiesa Molinari, 1963)
- Hemiberlesia crescentiae (Ferris, 1938)
- Hemiberlesia cupressi (Cockerell, 1899)
- Hemiberlesia cyanophylli (Signoret, 1869)
- Hemiberlesia diffinis (Newstead, 1893)
- Hemiberlesia elegans (Lindinger, 1913)
- Hemiberlesia flabellata Ferris, 1938
- Hemiberlesia gliwicensis (Komosinska, 1965)
- Hemiberlesia ignobilis Ferris, 1941
- Hemiberlesia insularis (Balachowsky, 1937)
- Hemiberlesia ithacae (Ferris, 1938)
- Hemiberlesia kudhiensis
- Hemiberlesia laciniata Gómez-Menor Ortega, 1965
- Hemiberlesia lataniae (Signoret, 1869) (Latania scale)
- Hemiberlesia latastei (Cockerell, 1894)
- Hemiberlesia liriodendri (Miller & Howard, 1981)
- Hemiberlesia loranthi (Laing, 1929)
- Hemiberlesia lottoi Balachowsky, 1956
- Hemiberlesia malagassa Mamet, 1959
- Hemiberlesia mammillaris (Lindinger, 1910)
- Hemiberlesia manengoubae Balachowsky, 1953
- Hemiberlesia massonianae Tang, 1984
- Hemiberlesia mendax McKenzie, 1943
- Hemiberlesia mitchelli (Marlatt, 1908)
- Hemiberlesia momicola (Takagi & Kawai, 1966)
- Hemiberlesia musae Takagi & Yamamoto, 1974
- Hemiberlesia nahari
- Hemiberlesia neodiffinis Miller & Davidson, 1998
- Hemiberlesia nothofagi Williams, 1985
- Hemiberlesia ocellata Takagi & Yamamoto, 1974
- Hemiberlesia oxycoccus (Woglum, 1906)
- Hemiberlesia ozolita Schneider, Claps, Wei, Normark & Normark, 2020
- Hemiberlesia palmae (Cockerell, 1893) (tropical palm scale)
- Hemiberlesia paucitatis (McKenzie, 1942)
- Hemiberlesia pictor (Williams, 1971)
- Hemiberlesia pitysophila Takagi, 1969
- Hemiberlesia popularum (Marlatt, 1908) (poplar scale)
- Hemiberlesia pseudorapax McKenzie, 1951
- Hemiberlesia quercicola Ferris, 1941 (irregular oak scale)
- Hemiberlesia rapax (Comstock, 1881) (greedy scale)
- Hemiberlesia ruebsaameni (Cockerell, 1902)
- Hemiberlesia securidacae (Hall, 1929)
- Hemiberlesia serrulata Liu & Feng, 2018
- Hemiberlesia silvestrii Gómez-Menor Ortega, 1956
- Hemiberlesia sinensis Ferris, 1953
- Hemiberlesia tectonae (Lindinger, 1913)
- Hemiberlesia uramanica Moghaddam, 2021
- Hemiberlesia zizyphi (Hall, 1929)
