= Denticularia =

Scientific classification
- Kingdom: Fungi
- Division: Ascomycota
- Class: incertae sedis
- Genus: Denticularia; F.C. Deighton, 1972

Species
- See text

Genus of fungi

Denticularia is a genus of ascomycete fungus. Its species are typically plant pathogens. Its taxonomy is unclear. It has been suggested to belong among the Mycosphaerellaceae, but this has not been proven. It is tentatively retained as a genus, awaiting further investigation via molecular sequencing.

== Species ==
- Denticularia fici
- Denticularia hachijoensis
- Denticularia limoniformis
- Denticularia mangiferae
- Denticularia modesta
- Denticularia terminaliae
- Denticularia tertia
