= Botryosphaeria cocogena =

Scientific classification
- Kingdom: Fungi
- Division: Ascomycota
- Class: Dothideomycetes
- Order: Botryosphaeriales
- Family: Botryosphaeriaceae
- Genus: Botryosphaeria
- Species: B. cocogena

Binomial name
- Botryosphaeria cocogena Subileau, Renard & Lacoste (1994)

Species of fungus

Botryosphaeria cocogena is a fungus species in the family Botryosphaeriaceae. Originally discovered in the Brazilian Amazon rainforest, it is a plant pathogen that causes blight in coconut leaves.
