= Botryosphaeria corticola =

Scientific classification
- Kingdom: Fungi
- Division: Ascomycota
- Class: Dothideomycetes
- Order: Botryosphaeriales
- Family: Botryosphaeriaceae
- Genus: Botryosphaeria
- Species: B. corticola

Binomial name
- Botryosphaeria corticola (A.J.L. Phillips, A. Alves & J. Luque) (2004)

Synonyms
- Diplodia corticola

Species of fungus

Bot canker of oak is a disease on stems, branches and twigs of oak trees in Europe and North America. The casual agent of Bot canker of oak is the fungus Botryosphaeria corticola. Bot canker of oak causes lesions and cankers on a wide range of oaks in Europe and most recently live oaks in North America. Some infections were formerly attributed to Botryosphaeria stevensii, but most likely represent infections by Botryosphaeria corticola. Botryosphaeria corticola is distinguishable from Botryosphaeria stevensii via ITS rDNA sequencing.

== Overview ==
Botryosphaeria corticola has caused infection of oak trees in Spain, Portugal, Morocco, Italy, Greece, Hungary, and the United States. Bot canker of oak kills trees in natural forests as well as in cork plantations. The cork industry in Portugal, Spain, France, Italy, and Morocco has been dealing with declining oaks for several years from biotic and abiotic factors. This disease has been seen in many cork plantations and is the most important contributor to the decline in the cork industry. When cork is harvested from the trees, the cork cambium is exposed creating a wound for the fungus to enter the trunk, and cause disease. Infection of other oaks is most likely through wounds as well. These wounds may be natural wounds, but there is evidence insect damage is involved, especially in coast live oak in California. Botryosphaeria corticola infects the twigs, branches and stems of oaks and degrades the cambial tissues. With the degradation of vascular tissues, the trees display wilting and dieback symptoms.

== Hosts ==
=== Europe/North Africa ===
- Cork oak (Quercus suber)
- Holm oak (Quercus ilex)
- Kermes oak (Quercus coccifera)
- Sessile oak (Quercus petraea)

=== North America ===
- White Oak (Quercus alba)
- Canyon live oak (Quercus chrysolepis)
- Coast live oak (Quercus agrifolia)
- Laurel oak (Quercus laurifolia)
- Live oak (Quercus virginiana)
- Grape (Vitis sp. )

== Management ==
Botryosphaeria corticola can be managed in high value trees, but there is no current management for forest trees. Carbendazim and thiophanate-methyl have shown to prevent infection in cork oak in Europe, where it is applied after cork has been harvested. Sanitation is the most common management technique for this disease. Branches with diseased tissue are pruned off, and heavily infected trees are removed. This prevents future infections by limiting the amount of spores in the area.

== Description ==
Botryosphaeria corticola (Diplodia corticola) is a ascomycete fungus. It has both asexual (Diplodia corticola) and sexual reproduction (Botryosphaeria corticola) stages occurring naturally.

The asexual spores (conidia) occur in pycnidia from conidiogenous cells, without conidiophores. Pycnidia are dark brown to black, circular, immersed, partially erumpent and up to 1 mm diameter.

The sexual spores are eight biseriate ascospores occur inside of asci occur in immersed, partially erumpent, dark brown to black pseudothecia, up to 1 mm in diameter.
