= Septobasidium euryae-groffii =

Scientific classification
- Domain: Eukaryota
- Kingdom: Fungi
- Division: Basidiomycota
- Class: Pucciniomycetes
- Order: Septobasidiales
- Family: Septobasidiaceae
- Genus: Septobasidium
- Species: S. euryae-groffii

Binomial name
- Septobasidium euryae-groffii Lu & Guo, 2010

Species of fungus

Septobasidium euryae-groffii is a plant pathogenic fungus in the genus Septobasidium. It was first isolated from Eurya groffii.
