= Septobasidium gaoligongense =

Scientific classification
- Domain: Eukaryota
- Kingdom: Fungi
- Division: Basidiomycota
- Class: Pucciniomycetes
- Order: Septobasidiales
- Family: Septobasidiaceae
- Genus: Septobasidium
- Species: S. gaoligongense

Binomial name
- Septobasidium gaoligongense Lu & Guo (2010)

Species of fungus

Septobasidium gaoligongense is a plant pathogenic fungus in the genus Septobasidium. It was first isolated from Eurya groffii.
