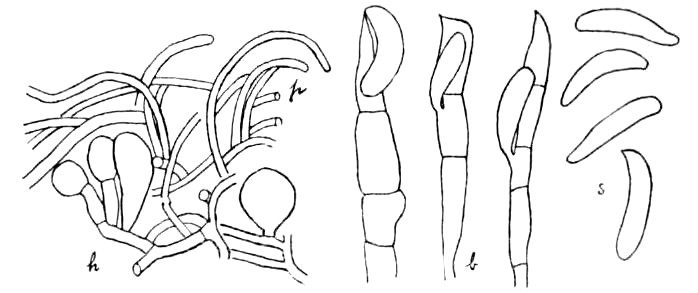
- Illustration to the original description of Septobasidium pseudopedicellatum. "S. pseudopedicellatum h, portion of hymenium showing the longitudinally interwoven hyphal ends or paraphyses and some probasidia; b, three spore-bearing organs; s, spores. × 640"

Scientific classification
- Kingdom: Fungi
- Division: Basidiomycota
- Class: Pucciniomycetes
- Order: Septobasidiales
- Family: Septobasidiaceae
- Genus: Septobasidium; Pat.

Species
- Species include: Septobasidium bogoriense; Septobasidium euryae-groffii; Septobasidium gaoligongense; Septobasidium pilosum; Septobasidium polygoni; Septobasidium pseudopedicellatum; Septobasidium theae; See also List of Septobasidium species

= Septobasidium =

Genus of fungi

Septobasidium is a fungal genus within the family Septobasidiaceae. Approximately 175 described species are associated with this genus. 227 records are listed by Species Fungorum.

Septobasidium species are known to be entomopathogens.

== Description ==
Septobasidium spp. are characterized by their presence on the underside of branches and leaves of deciduous trees, shrubs and in a symbiotic association with scale insects (Coccoidea), such as the Latania Scale Insect, Hemiberlesia lataniae. Also the European pear scale (Epidiaspis leperii (Signoret 1869)) and Septobasidium marianii Bres. which created a mutualistic symbiosis formed by the fungus and the scale insects on fruit trees in Slovenia.

Fruiting bodies form a crust (resupinate) and range in color and size, from small patches (1 mm in diameter) to 2 meters wide. Species of this genus are often distinguished based on the thickness of the fruiting body. Some species form elaborate chambers and tunnels that house scale insects with top and bottom layers while others form a very thin hyphal network. Microscopic characteristics, such as the number of basidiospores produced on a basidia, presence of pillars supporting the top layer (if applicable), number of cells in a basidia, and shape of haustoria (infectious cells) that form within the scale insects are used to distinguish species. Septobasidium is unique in that it is one of a few genera within the family Septobasidaceae that exists in symbiotic relationships with scale insects ranging from obligately parasitic to mutualistic.

This type of fungus is fairly unique for having a mutualistic relationship with scale insect hosts, rather than killing them. Although it weakens the insects it parasitizes, it does not kill them and it benefits the population as a whole, helping provide protection from parasitoid wasps by forming a mycelial mat that helps conceal the insects. The fungus benefits from the relationship, as it is nourished by the waste products the insects produce.

== Symbiotic association with insects ==
Couch proposed in 1938 that the symbiotic relationship between Septobasidium and scale insects was mutualistic. He suggested that at a population level, scale insects benefit from certain species of Septobasidium that provide protection from predators, and prevent desiccation. Couch also remarked that some scale insects remain uninfected while others are infected and rendered sterile. Some Septobasidium species provide no discernable shelter and parasitize all scale insects associated with the fruiting body. This suggests that the symbiotic relationships within this genus are complex, and merit further investigation. Additionally, no clear benefit has been demonstrated for scale insects associated with the fungus compared to free-living scale insects. The scale insect itself is a parasite of the host tree or shrub, resulting in a tri-partite symbiosis between the fungus, insect, and tree. The fungus itself does not parasitize the tree tissue and the scale insects do not need the fungus to survive.

During the spring months, basidia gives rise to sexual spores known as basidiospores that are capable of infecting a first instar scale insect walking across the surface of the fruiting body. The infected insect will either 1) settle with other scale insects within the same fruiting body it was infected by, 2) travel to another fruiting body and settle, or 3) move to an un-infected plant tissue and settle, forming a new colony of the fruiting body. Scale insects are mobile during the first instar after hatching, which co-occurs in the spring when basidiospores are released. Scale insects begin to feed on plant sap and settle into one location, eventually molting and shedding legs. Hyphae emerge from natural openings of infected insects and form a mycelial mat above the infected and non-infected insects. The life cycle completes itself when hyphae gives rise to new basidiospores on the surface of the mycelial mat during spring rain events, and infects the next generation of scale insects.

== See also ==
- Velvet blight
- Scale insect
