= Septobasidium theae =

Scientific classification
- Domain: Eukaryota
- Kingdom: Fungi
- Division: Basidiomycota
- Class: Pucciniomycetes
- Order: Septobasidiales
- Family: Septobasidiaceae
- Genus: Septobasidium
- Species: S. theae

Binomial name
- Septobasidium theae Boedijn & B.A. Steinm., (1931)

Species of fungus

Septobasidium theae is a plant pathogen, one of a number of fungi in the genus Septobasidium responsible for the disease of tea plants known commonly as "velvet blight".
