= Pestalotiopsis mangiferae =

Scientific classification
- Kingdom: Fungi
- Division: Ascomycota
- Class: Sordariomycetes
- Order: Amphisphaeriales
- Family: Sporocadaceae
- Genus: Pestalotiopsis
- Species: P. mangiferae

Binomial name
- Pestalotiopsis mangiferae (Henn.) Steyaert, (1909)

Synonyms
- Pestalotia mangiferae Henn., (1907)

Species of fungus

Pestalotiopsis mangiferae is a fungal plant pathogen infecting mangoes.
