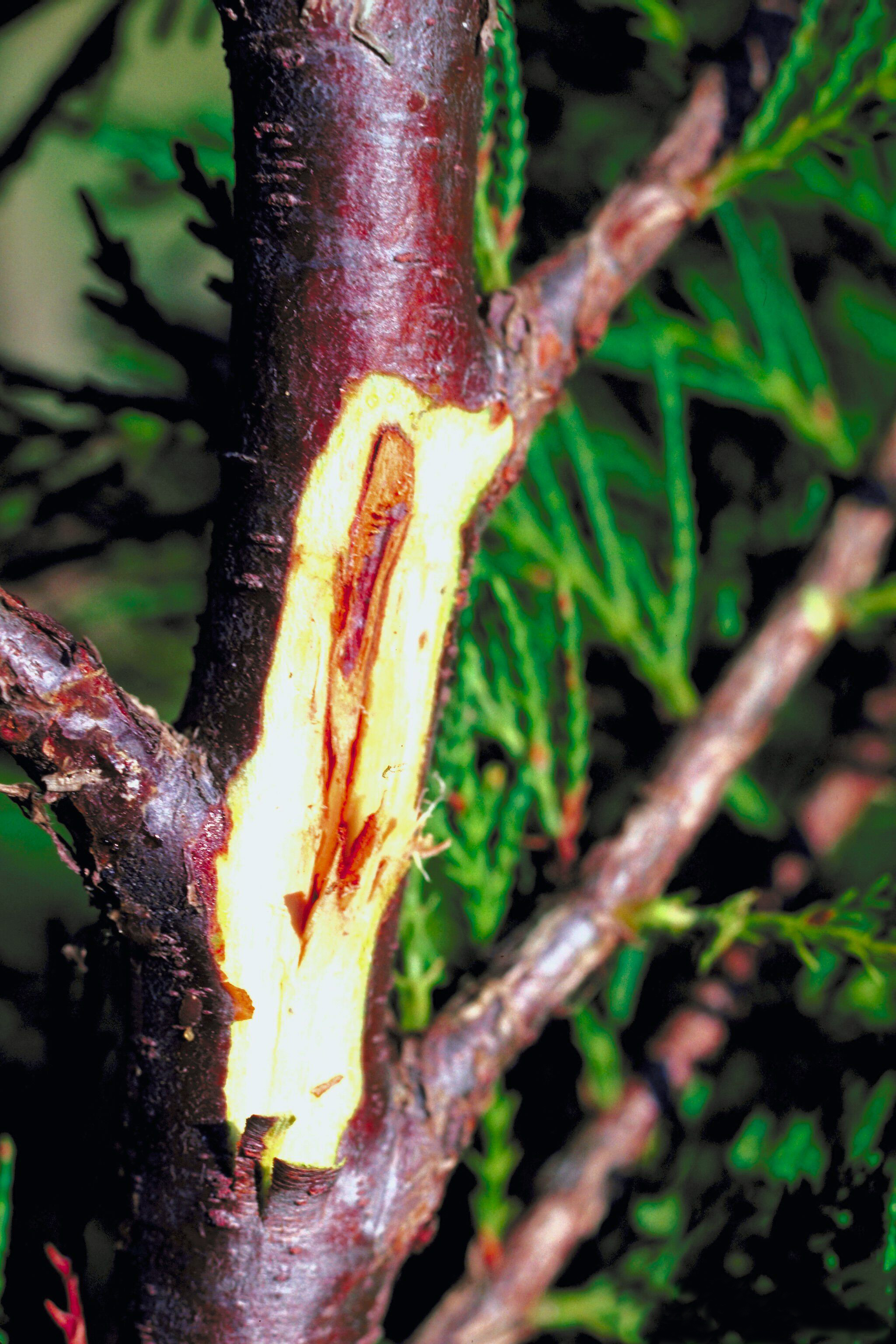
- A canker formed by Botryosphaeria dothidea on Leyland cypress

Scientific classification
- Kingdom: Fungi
- Division: Ascomycota
- Class: Dothideomycetes
- Order: Botryosphaeriales
- Family: Botryosphaeriaceae
- Genus: Botryosphaeria
- Species: B. dothidea

Binomial name
- Botryosphaeria dothidea (Moug. ex Fr.) Ces. & De Not.

Synonyms
- Botryosphaeria berengeriana De Not., Sfer. Caumadothis dothidea (Moug.) Petr. (1971); Dothiorella coronillae (Desm.) Petr. Dothiorella mali var. fructans Dearn. (1941); Fusicoccum aesculi Corda; Fusicoccum coronillae (Desm.) Vanev. & Aa; Macrophoma coronillae (Desm.) Höhn. Macrophomopsis coronillae (Desm.) Petr. Phyllosticta divergens Sacc. Sphaeria coronillae Desm. Sphaeria dothidea Moug. (1823)

= Botryosphaeria dothidea =

Species of fungus

Botryosphaeria dothidea is a plant pathogen that causes the formation of cankers on a wide variety of tree and shrub species. It has been reported on several hundred plant hosts and on all continents except Antarctica. B. dothidea was redefined in 2004, and some reports of its host range from prior to that time likely include species that have since been placed in another genus. Even so, B. dothidea has since been identified on a number of woody plants—including grape, mango, olive, eucalyptus, maple, and oak, among others—and is still expected to have a broad geographical distribution. While it is best known as a pathogen, the species has also been identified as an endophyte, existing in association with plant tissues on which disease symptoms were not observed. It can colonize some fruits, in addition to woody tissues.

== Life as a plant pathogen – "Bot rot" of apple ==
White rot, or "Bot rot", of apple is one of the many plant diseases that have been attributed to B. dothidea. Recent analysis has confirmed the presence of B. dothidea, along with other Botryosphaeria species, on Malus sp.. Cankers and other dead wood and bark tissue, as well as mummified fruit (fruit infected by the pathogen and remaining in the orchard) serve as sources of primary and secondary inoculum.

Both pycnidia and pseudothecia are observed on plant tissues, producing conidia and ascospores. Conidia are produced in greater numbers. Using spore traps for airborne spores and funnel traps for rainwater, Sutton (1981) determined that, while both conidia and ascospores of B. dothidea are released from infected pruning waste (dead wood) during rainfall events and conidia are predominantly water-dispersed, ascospores spread in both air and water. Conidia and ascospores germinate most readily at 28 to 32 °C (82 to 90 °F). (B. dothidea has been reported to grow best, in culture, at 25 to 30 °C (77 to 86 °F).) Lenticels and wounds provide locations for wood infection

The cankers of white rot appear similar to those of black rot, caused by Diplodia seriata (formerly B. obtusa). Girdling of limbs by cankers can result in yellowing ("chlorosis") of leaves on affected branches in the spring. While the precise time of fruit infection is unclear, symptoms of fruit rot appear approximately four to six weeks before harvest. The name "white rot" comes from the light brown color of the surface of affected red-skinned apples.

== Botryosphaeria dieback of trees and shrubs ==
Another common plant disease caused by Botryosphaeria dothidea is Botryosphaeria dieback, which is known to affect most common ornamental trees and shrubs. In particular, it is considered the most common disease of landscape rhododendrons. Symptoms of the disease start with flagging or wilting of specific branches or sections on an otherwise healthy plant. Those branches will later develop dark, sunken cankers with bark that peels or blisters around them. Both sporulating structures associated with the fungus can be found on the surface of infected tissues, either as individual structures or in dense groups. In severe cases, Botryosphaeria dieback can cause premature leaf drop or even death.

Plants are most at risk of Botryospaheria dieback when suffering from environmental or biological stressors, which reduce the resistance of the host plant. Infection starts at some sort of existing opening on the surface of the plant, typically through wounds or lenticils. On rhododendrons, infections can also start at a dead rachis and work backwards down the stem towards the base of the plant.

In early infections, Botryosphaeria dieback can be managed by pruning away infected branches to six inches past the point of discoloration in the tissue. If the infection progresses and becomes systemic, there is no effective treatment, as Botryosphaeria dothidea does not react to current fungicides. Instead of post-infection treatment, preventative measures have been shown to be more effective at limiting cases of Botryosphaeria dieback. Careful planning of landscape plantings, proper management and upkeep of plants, and avoiding damage to plant tissues are all ways to limit the risk of infection.

== Classification and characteristics ==
Botryosphaeria dothidea is the type species of the genus Botryosphaeria. While the International Botanical Congress recently emended the International Code of Nomenclature for algae, fungi, and plants to state that one fungal species should be called by one name, the sexual (teleomorphic) and asexual (anamorphic) stages of single fungal species have often been called by different names. B. dothidea was the name given to the teleomorphic form, and Fusicoccum aesculi has been identified the anamorph of B. dothidea, as currently defined. Phillips et al. (2013) chose to use the genus name Botryosphaeria, rather than Fusicoccum, since Botryosphaeria is commonly used and is the type genus of the family Botryosphaeriaceae.

Fries first published a description of B. dothidea as Sphaeria dothidea in Systema Mycologicum in 1823. Cesati and De Notaris described the genus Botryosphaeria and moved the species formerly known as S. dothidea into the new genus.

After determining that a type specimen consistent with the original description of Sphaeria dothidea, on ash, did not exist, Slippers et al. (2004) designated an epitype specimen to go along with a non-sporulating neotype from the collection of Fries, who published the original description of the species. Slippers et al. (2004) then revised the description of B. dothidea. The name is believed to have previously encompassed a species complex, and references to it in older literature might represent species now otherwise identified.

Like other members of the Dothideomycetes, the sexual stage of B. dothidea has bitunicate asci, which are borne in cavities ("ascomata") formed through a process known as "ascolocular development". In the case of B. dothidea, these ascomata are pseudothecia. The asci in the pseudothecia produce ascospores that can then infect plants. Like other species in the order Botryosphaeriales, B. dothidea ascomata have "multilayered dark brown walls" and contain septate pseudoparaphyses which are transparent or translucent (hyaline). Pseudothecia are sometimes located alone and other times clustered together.

In the asexual stage, conidia, which can also infect plants, are produced in pycnidia. The pycnidia and pseudothecia of B. dothidea look very similar. Microconidia have also been reported in at least one B. dothidea isolate. Microconidia are small, asexual spores that often act as male gametes or gametangia (spermatia) in a process of cytoplasmic fusion (plasmogamy)

According to a key provided in Phillips et al. (2013), B. dothidea can be distinguished from six other members of the genus by conidia that are typically longer than 20 μm, have a length to width ratio greater than 4.5, and occur on hosts other than Vaccinium species. These conidia are "narrowly...or irregularly fusiform," have thin walls, and are generally transparent or translucent (hyaline) and aseptate but sometimes form up to two septa and/or darken when they are older. Differentiating between species based on morphology depends on observing multiple samples, to get an idea of prevailing character states, and doing so at the appropriate developmental stage. Sequencing is considered an important companion to morphological identification
