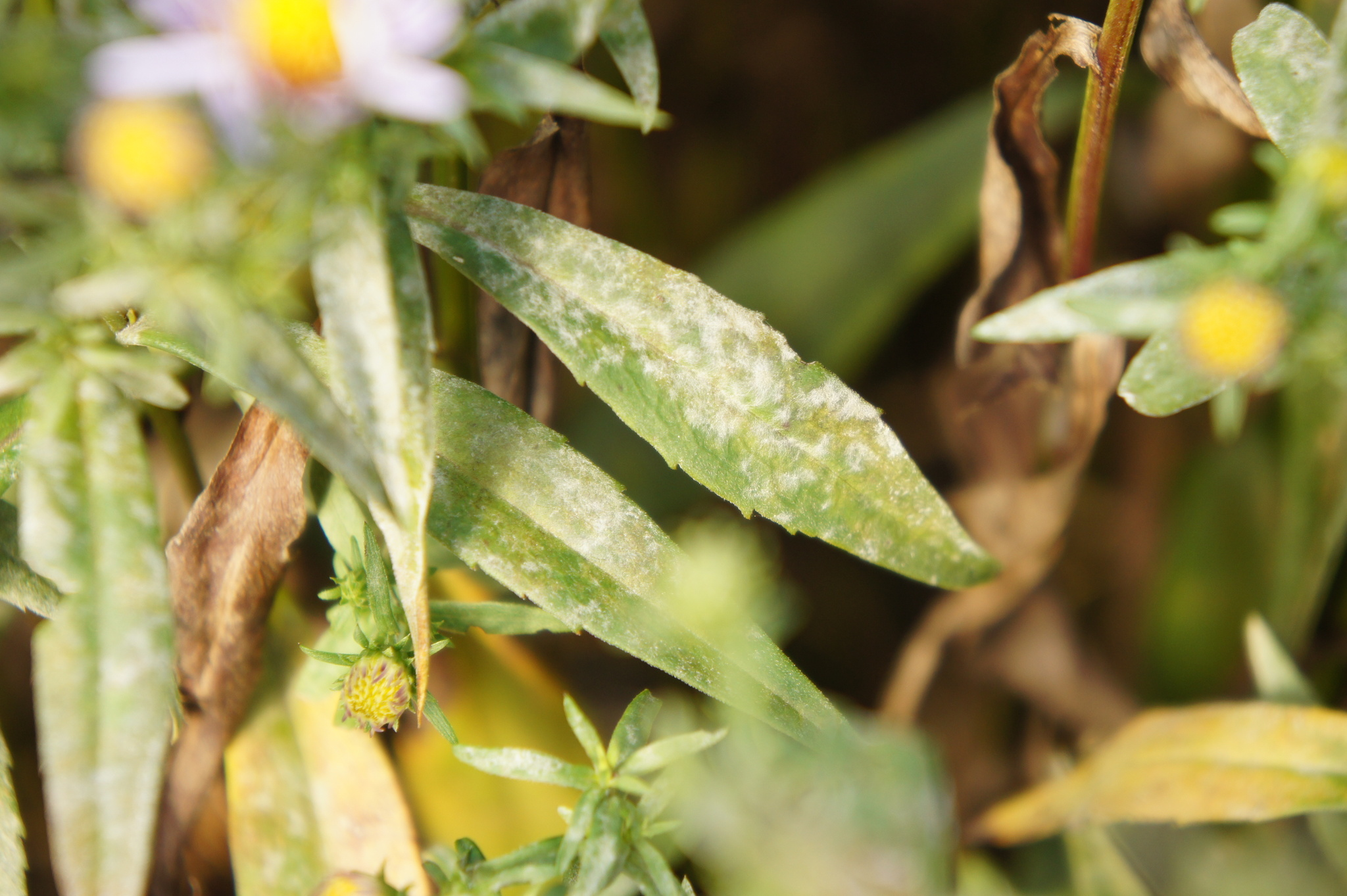
- Golovinomyces asterum on Symphyotrichum

Scientific classification
- Kingdom: Fungi
- Division: Ascomycota
- Class: Leotiomycetes
- Order: Helotiales
- Family: Erysiphaceae
- Genus: Golovinomyces
- Species: G. asterum

Binomial name
- Golovinomyces asterum (Schwein.) U. Braun, 2012

Synonyms
- Erysiphe asterum Schwein., 1832; Erysiphe cichoracearum f. asteris Jacz., 1927; Oidium astericola I. Hino & H. Kato, 1929; Oidium asteris-punicei Peck, 1911

= Golovinomyces asterum =

Species of fungus

Golovinomyces asterum is a species of powdery mildew in the family Erysiphaceae. It has a circumglobal distribution, where it affects multiple genera of the family Asteraceae.
