= Macrophoma mangiferae =

Scientific classification
- Kingdom: Fungi
- Division: Ascomycota
- Class: Dothideomycetes
- Order: Botryosphaeriales
- Family: Botryosphaeriaceae
- Genus: Macrophoma
- Species: M. mangiferae

Binomial name
- Macrophoma mangiferae Hing. & O.P. Sharma (1957)

Species of fungus

Macrophoma mangiferae is a fungal plant pathogen associated with stem rot and leaf blight in mangoes.
