= Botryosphaeria disrupta =

Scientific classification
- Kingdom: Fungi
- Division: Ascomycota
- Class: Dothideomycetes
- Order: Botryosphaeriales
- Family: Botryosphaeriaceae
- Genus: Botryosphaeria
- Species: B. disrupta

Binomial name
- Botryosphaeria disrupta (Berk. & M.A. Curtis) Arx & E. Müll., (1954)

Species of fungus

Botryosphaeria disrupta is a plant pathogen that causes canker and dieback in several important plant species such as mango and avocado.
