= Hendersonia creberrima =

Scientific classification
- Domain: Eukaryota
- Kingdom: Fungi
- Division: Ascomycota
- Class: Dothideomycetes
- Order: Pleosporales
- Family: Phaeosphaeriaceae
- Genus: Hendersonia
- Species: H. creberrima

Binomial name
- Hendersonia creberrima Syd. & P. Syd. & E.J. Butler

Species of fungus

Hendersonia creberrima is a fungal plant pathogen.
