= Cylindrocladium peruvianum =

Scientific classification
- Kingdom: Fungi
- Division: Ascomycota
- Class: Sordariomycetes
- Order: Hypocreales
- Family: Nectriaceae
- Genus: Cylindrocladium
- Species: C. peruvianum

Binomial name
- Cylindrocladium peruvianum Bat., J.L. Bezerra & M.P. Herrera, (1965)

Synonyms
- Cylindrocladiella peruviana (Bat., J.L. Bezerra & M.P. Herrera) Boesew., (1982)

Species of fungus

Cylindrocladium peruvianum is a fungal plant pathogen.
