= Septobasidium pseudopedicellatum =

Scientific classification
- Kingdom: Fungi
- Division: Basidiomycota
- Class: Pucciniomycetes
- Order: Septobasidiales
- Family: Septobasidiaceae
- Genus: Septobasidium
- Species: S. pseudopedicellatum

Binomial name
- Septobasidium pseudopedicellatum Burt (1916)

Species of fungus

Septobasidium pseudopedicellatum is a plant pathogen infecting mangoes.
