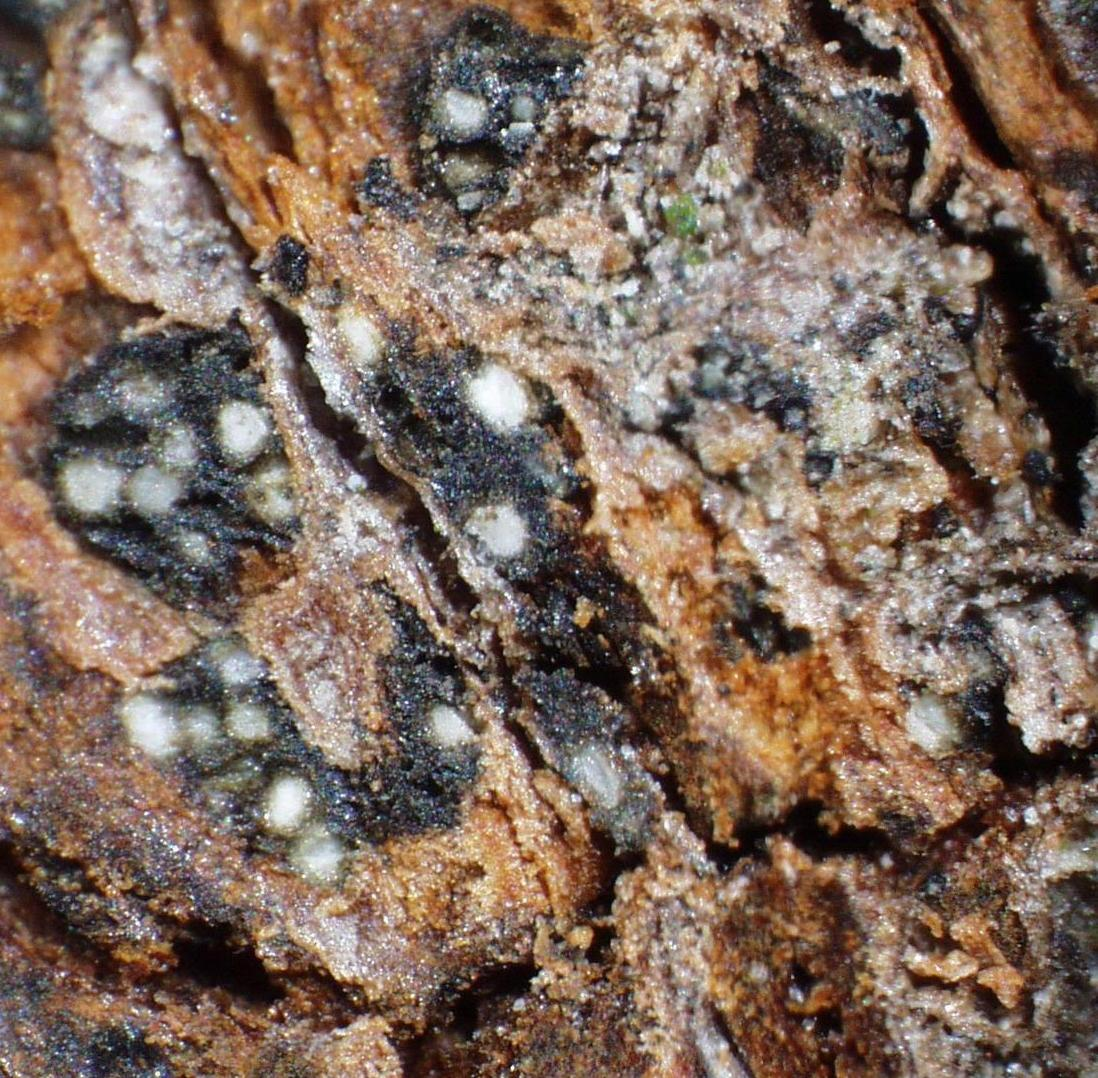
- Fruiting bodies of B. ribis on chokeberry

Scientific classification
- Kingdom: Fungi
- Division: Ascomycota
- Class: Dothideomycetes
- Order: Botryosphaeriales
- Family: Botryosphaeriaceae
- Genus: Botryosphaeria
- Species: B. ribis

Binomial name
- Botryosphaeria ribis Grossenb. & Duggar, (1911)

Synonyms
- Botryodiplodia ribis (Fuckel) Petr., (1927); Botryosphaeria berengeriana De Not., (1863); Dothiorella ribis (Fuckel) Sacc., (1884); Podosporium ribis Fuckel, (1870)

= Botryosphaeria ribis =

Species of fungus

Botryosphaeria ribis is a fungal plant pathogen that infects many trees causing cankers, dieback and death.

== Hosts and symptoms ==
Botryosphaeria ribis is an ascomycete plant pathogen that primarily affects woody hosts in a number of temperate and tropical regions. The susceptible hosts include a number of economically important plants such as apple, peach, almond, banana, and walnut trees, among others. The disease is noted by cankers, leaf spots, and necrosis, as well as twig dieback.

On healthy leaves, the necrosis begins apically at the margins, extending back along the midrib, occasionally reaching the base and causing complete blight of the leaf. Twig dieback also starts apically and works towards the center of the plant. It is characterized by a slow necrosis of the branch, leaving large, dead limbs on the upper portions of trees. Under the microscope, it can be identified by its immersed, pyriform perithecia (pear-shaped, spore-containing structures), which have a brown exterior wall. The ascospores within the perithecia are ellipsoid in shape, with a smooth exterior and granular cytoplasm. The anamorph (asexual stage) of B. ribis is Fusicoccum ribis, and although less abundant, it is characterized by globose pycnidia containing smooth, hyaline macro- and microconidia. These symptoms have the potential to significantly decrease yield or kill the host.

== Life cycle ==
Infections typically occur during late spring and early summer. B. ribis is an opportunistic pathogen, and it often does not have any means of infecting a plant other than through an open wound of a stressed host. Within the host, the pathogen develops groups of perithecia under the dermal layer, which eventually rupture through, releasing ascospores to disseminate by wind. By August or September, the asexual stage is also active in the production of pycnidia, which provide a second means of inoculum through conidia. Some hosts such as the pistachio tree have only been observed to be susceptible to the asexual stage of the pathogen. B. ribis is able to overwinter within the pycnidia of its asexual stage and through harboring within the infected tissues of the living host. Infected twigs, leaves, and buds are able to provide inoculum for up to 3 years.

== Environment ==
Botryosphaeria ribis germinates at its greatest rate when the temperature is 25–30 °C. At 5 °C growth was unnoticeable or absent, and the pathogen lost all viability at temperatures above 45 °C. Since this pathogen affects trees, orchards are very susceptible to infection due to the genetic uniformity of the plants therein. Furthermore, the individuals on the edges of the fields are often exposed to additional stressors compared to those in the middle of the field, such as increased exposure to weather, competition with other species, and an increased chance of encountering other pathogens. All of these improve the chance that B. ribis will be able to establish a successful infection. Native stands adjacent to orchards may also be at risk due to the increased inoculum pressure from these fields.
