= Johncouchia =

Scientific classification
- Kingdom: Fungi
- Division: Basidiomycota
- Class: Pucciniomycetes
- Order: Septobasidiales
- Family: Septobasidiaceae
- Genus: Johncouchia; S. Hughes & Cavalc.
- Species: J. mangiferae

Binomial name
- Johncouchia mangiferae (Bat.) S. Hughes & Cavalc., (1983)

Synonyms
- Cladotrichum mangiferae Bat., (1956)

Genus of fungi

Johncouchia mangiferae is a fungal plant pathogen. It causes felt fungus on mango. It is the only species in the genus Johncouchia.
