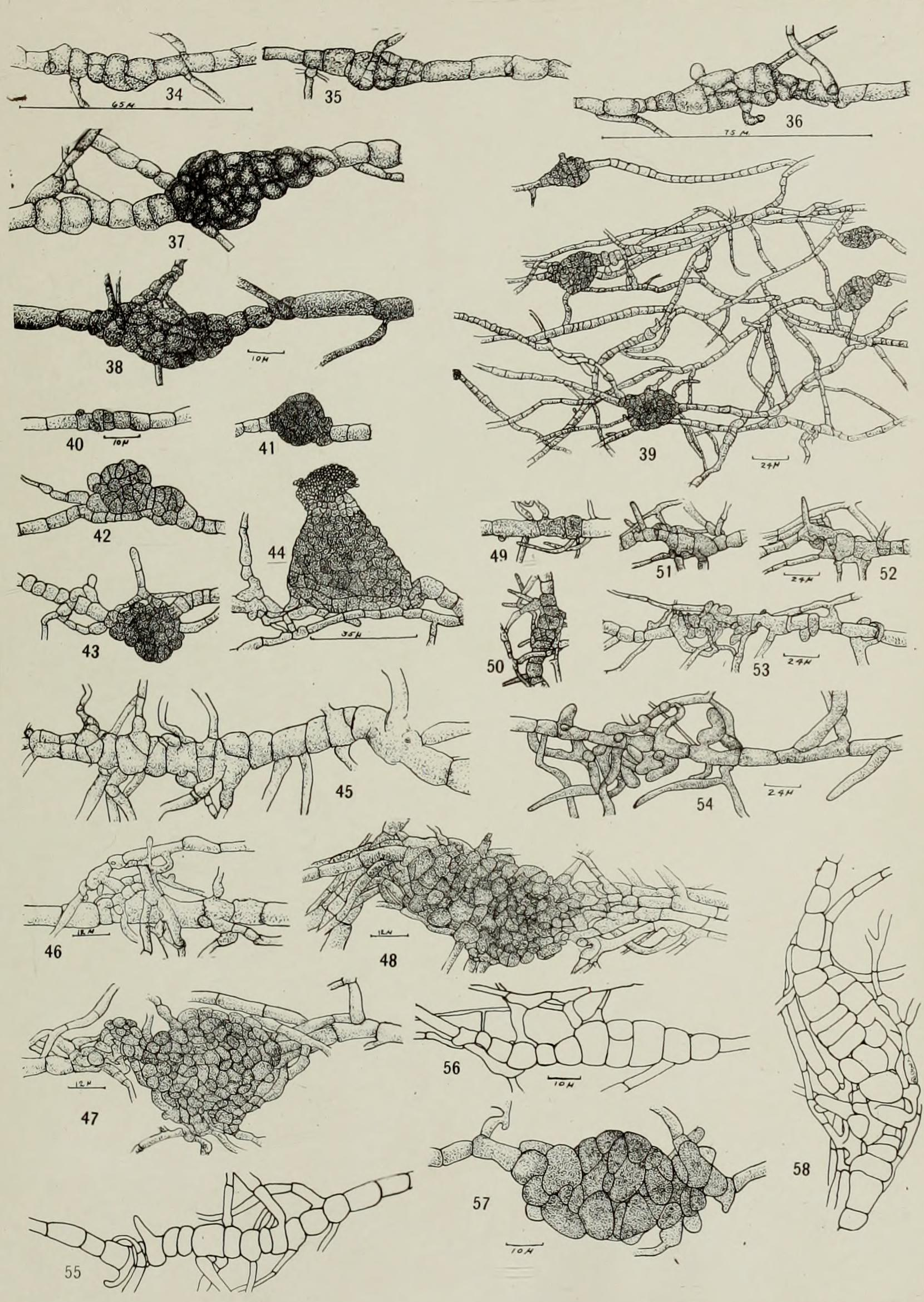
- Illustrations of Macrophoma citrulli

Scientific classification
- Kingdom: Fungi
- Division: Ascomycota
- Class: Dothideomycetes
- Order: Botryosphaeriales
- Family: Botryosphaeriaceae
- Genus: Macrophoma (Sacc.) Berl. & Voglino 1886

Species
- See text

= Macrophoma =

Genus of fungi

Macrophoma is a genus of anamorphic fungi in the family Botryosphaeriaceae. Some of these species are pathogenic: for example, M. musae is a banana pathogen that causes discoloration.

== Species ==
- Macrophoma abietis
- Macrophoma abietis-pectinatae
- Macrophoma abscondita
- Macrophoma acaciaecola
- Macrophoma acanthina
- Macrophoma aceris
- Macrophoma acervata
- Macrophoma achyranthis
- Macrophoma acinicola
- Macrophoma acinorum
- Macrophoma aconiti
- Macrophoma actinidiae
- Macrophoma acuaria
- Macrophoma adenii
- Macrophoma aegles
- Macrophoma aequivoca
- Macrophoma agapanthi
- Macrophoma agaves
- Macrophoma ailanthi
- Macrophoma akitensis
- Macrophoma alaterni
- Macrophoma albifructa
- Macrophoma albiziae
- Macrophoma alcearum
- Macrophoma allahabadensis
- Macrophoma allantospora
- Macrophoma allospora
- Macrophoma alni
- Macrophoma alnigena
- Macrophoma aloës
- Macrophoma aloëtica
- Macrophoma amaryllidicola
- Macrophoma americana
- Macrophoma ampelopsidis
- Macrophoma amsoniae
- Macrophoma annonae
- Macrophoma antarctica
- Macrophoma anthurii
- Macrophoma antirrhini
- Macrophoma aphyllantis
- Macrophoma aquilegiae
- Macrophoma araliae
- Macrophoma arengae
- Macrophoma arens
- Macrophoma ariae
- Macrophoma aromatica
- Macrophoma artabotrydicola
- Macrophoma artemisiae
- Macrophoma arundinae
- Macrophoma asphodeli
- Macrophoma aspidistrae
- Macrophoma astericola
- Macrophoma atraphaxis
- Macrophoma aucubae
- Macrophoma aucubana
- Macrophoma aucubicola
- Macrophoma aurantii
- Macrophoma azorici
- Macrophoma baccariniana
- Macrophoma bacillaris
- Macrophoma baculum
- Macrophoma bakeri
- Macrophoma barringtoniae
- Macrophoma bengalensis
- Macrophoma bignoniae
- Macrophoma boerhaviae
- Macrophoma bohemica
- Macrophoma bolbophila
- Macrophoma boltoniae
- Macrophoma borziana
- Macrophoma boussingaultiae
- Macrophoma brasiliensis
- Macrophoma brevipes
- Macrophoma brezhnevii
- Macrophoma brunnea
- Macrophoma brunneo-fincta
- Macrophoma burserae
- Macrophoma byrsonimae
- Macrophoma caballeroi
- Macrophoma cajanicola
- Macrophoma cakiles
- Macrophoma calophylli
- Macrophoma calotropidis
- Macrophoma camarana
- Macrophoma camelliae
- Macrophoma canephorae
- Macrophoma cannae-indicae
- Macrophoma capsellae
- Macrophoma caricina
- Macrophoma carpinicola
- Macrophoma caryotae
- Macrophoma cassavae
- Macrophoma cassiocarpa
- Macrophoma castaneicola
- Macrophoma cattleyicola
- Macrophoma cavarae
- Macrophoma ceanothi
- Macrophoma celastrina
- Macrophoma celtidicola
- Macrophoma cephalanthae
- Macrophoma cerasina
- Macrophoma cercidis
- Macrophoma cercidospora
- Macrophoma cercis
- Macrophoma chenopodii
- Macrophoma chilicola
- Macrophoma chionanthi
- Macrophoma choisyae
- Macrophoma chollematospora
- Macrophoma chrysothamni
- Macrophoma cinnamomi-glanduliferi
- Macrophoma circinans
- Macrophoma citri
- Macrophoma citrulli
- Macrophoma clavuligera
- Macrophoma clematidis
- Macrophoma clitoricarpa
- Macrophoma cliviae
- Macrophoma cneori
- Macrophoma cocculi
- Macrophoma cocophila
- Macrophoma cocos
- Macrophoma coffeae
- Macrophoma collabens
- Macrophoma commelinae
- Macrophoma conica
- Macrophoma convolvulacearum
- Macrophoma convolvuli
- Macrophoma cordylines
- Macrophoma coronillae
- Macrophoma coronillae-emeri
- Macrophoma corticicola
- Macrophoma corylina
- Macrophoma crassipes
- Macrophoma crataegi
- Macrophoma crescentina
- Macrophoma crinicola
- Macrophoma crozalsii
- Macrophoma cruciferarum
- Macrophoma cruenta
- Macrophoma crustosa
- Macrophoma cucurbitacearum
- Macrophoma cupressi
- Macrophoma cyamopsidis
- Macrophoma cycadis
- Macrophoma cylindrica
- Macrophoma cynanchina
- Macrophoma dalbergiicola
- Macrophoma daphniphylli
- Macrophoma decorticans
- Macrophoma decosteae
- Macrophoma dendrocalami
- Macrophoma depressula
- Macrophoma dianthi
- Macrophoma dictamni
- Macrophoma diospyri
- Macrophoma diospyricola
- Macrophoma dodonaeae
- Macrophoma dracaenae-fragrantis
- Macrophoma draconis
- Macrophoma dryadis
- Macrophoma dryopteris
- Macrophoma duvauicola
- Macrophoma dyckiae
- Macrophoma edulis
- Macrophoma ehretiae
- Macrophoma elongata
- Macrophoma endophlaea
- Macrophoma engleriana
- Macrophoma ensetes
- Macrophoma enteleae
- Macrophoma ephedrae
- Macrophoma epidendri
- Macrophoma eremosparti
- Macrophoma eriobotryae
- Macrophoma erumpens
- Macrophoma eryngii
- Macrophoma eucalyptorum
- Macrophoma eugeniae
- Macrophoma euonymi
- Macrophoma euonymicola
- Macrophoma euonymi-japonicae
- Macrophoma euphorbiae
- Macrophoma euphorbiicola
- Macrophoma eusticta
- Macrophoma exaci
- Macrophoma fabae
- Macrophoma fagoniae
- Macrophoma fagopyri
- Macrophoma fagopyricola
- Macrophoma falconeri
- Macrophoma farlowiana
- Macrophoma fici
- Macrophoma fici-caricae
- Macrophoma ficina
- Macrophoma filamentosa
- Macrophoma fimicola
- Macrophoma fitzpatriciana
- Macrophoma flaccida
- Macrophoma fomitalis
- Macrophoma forsythiae
- Macrophoma fragilis
- Macrophoma fraxini
- Macrophoma fusigera
- Macrophoma fusispora
- Macrophoma gallicola
- Macrophoma genistae
- Macrophoma georgica
- Macrophoma geranii
- Macrophoma gibelliana
- Macrophoma gladioli
- Macrophoma glandaria
- Macrophoma glaucii
- Macrophoma glochidii
- Macrophoma gloeosporioides
- Macrophoma glycosmidis
- Macrophoma gongrogena
- Macrophoma gordoniae
- Macrophoma gossypii
- Macrophoma gouaniae
- Macrophoma graminicola
- Macrophoma granatensis
- Macrophoma grossetexta
- Macrophoma grossulariae
- Macrophoma guevinae
- Macrophoma gymnopogri
- Macrophoma haloxyli
- Macrophoma halstedii
- Macrophoma haraeana
- Macrophoma hederacea
- Macrophoma hedychii
- Macrophoma helicina
- Macrophoma hemerocallidis
- Macrophoma hennebergii
- Macrophoma henriquesiana
- Macrophoma heptapleuri
- Macrophoma heraclei
- Macrophoma heterospora
- Macrophoma heuffelii
- Macrophoma hibisci
- Macrophoma hibiscicola
- Macrophoma hippoglossi
- Macrophoma hispalensis
- Macrophoma hispanica
- Macrophoma hochreutineri
- Macrophoma holoschoeni
- Macrophoma holosteicola
- Macrophoma horaninoviae
- Macrophoma hypomutilospora
- Macrophoma ilicella
- Macrophoma ilicis-cornutae
- Macrophoma insulana
- Macrophoma ipomoeae
- Macrophoma ischurochloae
- Macrophoma jaczevskii
- Macrophoma janiphae
- Macrophoma japonica
- Macrophoma jasminicola
- Macrophoma jodinae
- Macrophoma juglandaria
- Macrophoma juglandis
- Macrophoma juncei
- Macrophoma kalanchoës
- Macrophoma keckii
- Macrophoma labiatarum
- Macrophoma laburni
- Macrophoma lagenariae
- Macrophoma lagerstroemiae
- Macrophoma lanceolata
- Macrophoma launaeae
- Macrophoma lauri
- Macrophoma laurina
- Macrophoma laurocerasi
- Macrophoma leguminum
- Macrophoma lentiscina
- Macrophoma leopoldivora
- Macrophoma lepidii
- Macrophoma leptopoda
- Macrophoma leucorrhodia
- Macrophoma leucothoës
- Macrophoma ligustica
- Macrophoma lilii
- Macrophoma liliicola
- Macrophoma linderae
- Macrophoma lini
- Macrophoma livistonae
- Macrophoma longispora
- Macrophoma luffae
- Macrophoma lupini
- Macrophoma luzonensis
- Macrophoma maclurae
- Macrophoma macrochloae
- Macrophoma macrosperma
- Macrophoma macrospora
- Macrophoma maesae
- Macrophoma magnifructua
- Macrophoma magnoliae
- Macrophoma malcomiae
- Macrophoma malenconii
- Macrophoma malpighiae
- Macrophoma mamillaris
- Macrophoma mangiferae
- Macrophoma manihotis
- Macrophoma mantegazziana
- Macrophoma mariesii
- Macrophoma maticola
- Macrophoma maublancii
- Macrophoma medicaginis
- Macrophoma megasperma
- Macrophoma melanostigma
- Macrophoma meloplaca
- Macrophoma memorabilis
- Macrophoma mexicana
- Macrophoma micromegala
- Macrophoma miersi
- Macrophoma millepunctata
- Macrophoma miltoniae
- Macrophoma mimuli
- Macrophoma minima
- Macrophoma minuta
- Macrophoma mirabilis
- Macrophoma monsterae
- Macrophoma morindae
- Macrophoma mucipara
- Macrophoma multiflorana
- Macrophoma musarum
- Macrophoma mygindae
- Macrophoma nasturtii
- Macrophoma negundinis
- Macrophoma nelumbii
- Macrophoma neottopteridis
- Macrophoma nerii
- Macrophoma neriicola
- Macrophoma nervicola
- Macrophoma nevadensis
- Macrophoma nicotianae
- Macrophoma nitens
- Macrophoma nobilis
- Macrophoma numerosa
- Macrophoma nuptialis
- Macrophoma oblongata
- Macrophoma obsoleta
- Macrophoma oenotherae
- Macrophoma oenotherae-biennis
- Macrophoma oleandri
- Macrophoma oleandrina
- Macrophoma oncidii
- Macrophoma onobrychidis
- Macrophoma ononidicola
- Macrophoma opuntiae-phaeacanthae
- Macrophoma opuntiae-robustae
- Macrophoma opuntiicola
- Macrophoma orchidicola
- Macrophoma oreophila
- Macrophoma oryzae
- Macrophoma pachysandrae
- Macrophoma paeoniae
- Macrophoma pallida
- Macrophoma pandani
- Macrophoma paniculata
- Macrophoma papaveris
- Macrophoma papayae
- Macrophoma paraphysata
- Macrophoma passerinii
- Macrophoma passiflorae
- Macrophoma passifloricola
- Macrophoma paulistana
- Macrophoma peckiana
- Macrophoma pedrosensis
- Macrophoma pegani
- Macrophoma pellicida
- Macrophoma pellucida
- Macrophoma pentapanacis
- Macrophoma pentatropidis
- Macrophoma pernettyae
- Macrophoma perseae
- Macrophoma persicina
- Macrophoma petiolata
- Macrophoma petiolicola
- Macrophoma petrakiana
- Macrophoma phacidiella
- Macrophoma phacidioides
- Macrophoma phaseolicola
- Macrophoma phaseoli-lunati
- Macrophoma philesiae
- Macrophoma philodendri
- Macrophoma phlei
- Macrophoma phomiformis
- Macrophoma phormiana
- Macrophoma phormii
- Macrophoma phorodendri
- Macrophoma photiniae
- Macrophoma phyllerium
- Macrophoma phyllocacti
- Macrophoma phyllogenata
- Macrophoma physalospora
- Macrophoma piceae
- Macrophoma pilocarpi
- Macrophoma pini-densiflorae
- Macrophoma pinsaponis
- Macrophoma piperina
- Macrophoma piperis
- Macrophoma pisoniae
- Macrophoma pistaciae
- Macrophoma pistaciicola
- Macrophoma pittosporina
- Macrophoma pituranthi
- Macrophoma plumeriae
- Macrophoma politii
- Macrophoma polygonati
- Macrophoma populi
- Macrophoma populi-nigrae
- Macrophoma porteri
- Macrophoma pritchardiae
- Macrophoma projecta
- Macrophoma prosopidis
- Macrophoma pulchrispora
- Macrophoma punctiformis
- Macrophoma purpurascens
- Macrophoma pycnocomonis
- Macrophoma pyrenacanthae
- Macrophoma pyri
- Macrophoma quercicola
- Macrophoma ramulicola
- Macrophoma ranunculi
- Macrophoma raphidophorae
- Macrophoma raui
- Macrophoma reichenbachiana
- Macrophoma restaldii
- Macrophoma rhabdosporioides
- Macrophoma rhaphidophorae
- Macrophoma rhoina
- Macrophoma ricini
- Macrophoma romanzoffiana
- Macrophoma rosae
- Macrophoma rotalae
- Macrophoma rubi
- Macrophoma rumicicola
- Macrophoma rumicis
- Macrophoma sacchari
- Macrophoma saginae
- Macrophoma salicaria
- Macrophoma salicina
- Macrophoma salicis
- Macrophoma samaricola
- Macrophoma sapindi
- Macrophoma saponariae
- Macrophoma scandens
- Macrophoma scaphidiospora
- Macrophoma schefflerae
- Macrophoma scheidweileri
- Macrophoma scutellata
- Macrophoma secalina
- Macrophoma seminalis
- Macrophoma senecionis
- Macrophoma seriata
- Macrophoma sheldonii
- Macrophoma shoreae
- Macrophoma sicula
- Macrophoma sinensis
- Macrophoma sisymbrii
- Macrophoma smilacinae
- Macrophoma smilacis
- Macrophoma solanicola
- Macrophoma sophorae
- Macrophoma sophoricola
- Macrophoma sorghicola
- Macrophoma spegazzinii
- Macrophoma sphaeropsispora
- Macrophoma sphaerosperma
- Macrophoma sporoboli
- Macrophoma stachydis
- Macrophoma stanhopeicola
- Macrophoma stephanotidis
- Macrophoma sterculiae
- Macrophoma stiparum
- Macrophoma strobi
- Macrophoma subconica
- Macrophoma suberis
- Macrophoma subiculis
- Macrophoma sugi
- Macrophoma superposita
- Macrophoma surinamensis
- Macrophoma suspecta
- Macrophoma sycophila
- Macrophoma sydowiana
- Macrophoma symbolanthi
- Macrophoma tabaci
- Macrophoma tagetis
- Macrophoma tamaricis
- Macrophoma tami
- Macrophoma tertia
- Macrophoma thalictricola
- Macrophoma theicola
- Macrophoma thermopsidis
- Macrophoma thujana
- Macrophoma toddaliae
- Macrophoma triacanthi
- Macrophoma trichosanthis
- Macrophoma trichostomi
- Macrophoma tricyrtidis
- Macrophoma trigonellae
- Macrophoma tristaniae
- Macrophoma triticina
- Macrophoma tumefaciens
- Macrophoma turconii
- Macrophoma ulcinjensis
- Macrophoma ulmi
- Macrophoma ulmicola
- Macrophoma urenae
- Macrophoma utriculorum
- Macrophoma vanillae
- Macrophoma varanasiensis
- Macrophoma veronensis
- Macrophoma versabilis
- Macrophoma versatilis
- Macrophoma viburni
- Macrophoma viciosoi
- Macrophoma villaresiae
- Macrophoma vincae
- Macrophoma vincetoxici
- Macrophoma volkameriae
- Macrophoma xanthina
- Macrophoma yamabeana
- Macrophoma yuccae
- Macrophoma yuccicarpa
- Macrophoma zanthoxyli
- Macrophoma zeae
- Macrophoma zeraphiana
- Macrophoma zeylanicae
- Macrophoma ziziphina
