= Denticularia mangiferae =

Scientific classification
- Kingdom: Fungi
- Division: Ascomycota
- Class: incertae sedis
- Genus: Denticularia
- Species: D. mangiferae

Binomial name
- Denticularia mangiferae (Bitanc. & Jenkins) Alcorn, Grice & R.A. Peterson, (1999)

Synonyms
- Sphaceloma mangiferae Bitanc. & Jenkins, (1956)

Species of fungus

Denticularia mangiferae is an ascomycete fungus that is a plant pathogen.
