= Septobasidium pilosum =

Scientific classification
- Domain: Eukaryota
- Kingdom: Fungi
- Division: Basidiomycota
- Class: Pucciniomycetes
- Order: Septobasidiales
- Family: Septobasidiaceae
- Genus: Septobasidium
- Species: S. pilosum

Binomial name
- Septobasidium pilosum Boedijn & B.A. Steinm. (1930)

Species of fungus

Septobasidium pilosum is a plant pathogen, one of a number of fungi in the genus Septobasidium responsible for the disease of tea plants known commonly as "velvet blight".
