= Septobasidiaceae =

Scientific classification
- Kingdom: Fungi
- Division: Basidiomycota
- Class: Pucciniomycetes
- Order: Septobasidiales; Couch ex Donk,
- Family: Septobasidiaceae; Racib.,

Type genus
- Septobasidium Pat. 1892.

Genera
- Aphelariopsis Jülich (1); Auriculoscypha D.A. Reid & Manim. (1); Coccidiodictyon Oberw. (1); Johncouchia S. Hughes & Cavalc. (1); Septobasidium Pat. (200); Uredinella Couch (2)

Synonyms
- Glenosporaceae Nann. in Polacci, Tratt. Micopatol. Umana 4: 423. 1934.

Order of fungi

The Septobasidiales are an order of rust fungi in the class Pucciniomycetes. It contains the single family Septobasidiaceae, which itself comprises six genera: Aphelariopsis Jülich (with 1 species), Auriculoscypha D.A. Reid & Manim. (with 1 species), Coccidiodictyon Oberw. (with 1 species), Johncouchia S. Hughes & Cavalc. (with 1 species), Septobasidium Pat. (with about 200 species) and lastly, Uredinella Couch (with 2 species).

== History ==
The order Septobasidiales was circumscribed in 1964 by Marinus Anton Donk, based on an earlier description by John Nathaniel Couch in 1938. When the order used to contain just 3 families; Auriculoscyphaceae, Septobasidiaceae and Uredinellaceae. It was reduced to just Septobasidiaceae with the other families being absorbed in the one family and one order.

They are generally parasitic on plants, while some species are parasitic on or symbiotic with scale insects (of the order Homoptera). They have basidiospores (reproductive spore) that germinate on insects, with the haustoria (rootlike structure that grows into or around another structure to absorb water or nutrients) coiled inside insect. Septobasidiales are perennial and thus exhibit distinct seasonal responses. Growth occurs during the wet season and ceases or slows at the onset of the dry or cold season.

These fungi are, effectively, zoophilic rusts whose nourishment derives wholly from partial parasitism of scale insect populations underlying crust-like fungal thalli. The global knowledge of these fungi depends heavily on a classic monograph by Couch (1938). Later large scale studies of this genus include those by Azema (1975), and the validation (Gómez & Henk, 2004) of Couch's (1938), many new but invalidly published species of Septobasidium.

The Septobasidiaceae family contain 5 genera and over 180 species that are parasitic on scale insects (especially the Coccoidea). This group of fungi have been studied rarely, with the exception of the early work of Couch (1938), and a small number of recent publications (e.g., Henk and Vilgalys 2007, who studied DNA sequence data of several species). Collections of Septobasidiaceae are scant, and living cultures are even rarer.

The largest and most important genus is Septobasidium, which grows as mats of hyphae covering and embedding scale insects on branches and leaves of trees.

Septobasidium is a genus that is practically worldwide in distribution, ranging throughout the tropics and into temperate Africa, Asia, Australia, Europe, North America, and South America. It is very abundant in certain localities, and it also occurs on a great variety of wild and cultivated woody plants, such as citrus, apple, tea, and rubber, sometimes causing much damage.

== Genera ==
- Aphelariopsis Jülich - Aphelariopsis colombiana (A.L. Welden) Jülich (1982)
- Auriculoscypha D.A. Reid & Manim. - Auriculoscypha anacardiicola D.A. Reid & Manim. (1985)
- Coccidiodictyon Oberw. - Coccidiodictyon inconspicuum Oberw. (1989)
- Johncouchia S. Hughes & Cavalc. - Johncouchia mangiferae (Bat.) S. Hughes & Cavalc. (1983)
- Septobasidium Pat. - (about 200 species, see List of Septobasidium species)
- Uredinella Couch - Uredinella coccidiophaga Couch (1937) and Uredinella spinulosa Couch & Petch (1941)

== Distribution ==
Species in the order and the family are found worldwide, they have a cosmopolitan distribution. Including China, the United States, Costa Rica, and Mexico.

== Other sources ==
- Buller, A. H. Reginald (1939). "The Genus Septobasidium". Nature. 144 (3647): 531. Bibcode:1939Natur.144..531B. doi:10.1038/144531a0. S2CID 4129457.
- Couch, J. N. 1937. A new fungus intermediate between the rusts and Septobasidium. Mycologia 29: 665–673.
