= Phyllosticta coryli =

Scientific classification
- Kingdom: Fungi
- Division: Ascomycota
- Class: Dothideomycetes
- Order: Botryosphaeriales
- Family: Botryosphaeriaceae
- Genus: Phyllosticta
- Species: P. coryli

Binomial name
- Phyllosticta coryli Westend. (1872)

Species of fungus

Phyllosticta coryli is a plant pathogen infecting hazelnut.
