= Phyllosticta perseae =

Scientific classification
- Kingdom: Fungi
- Division: Ascomycota
- Class: Dothideomycetes
- Order: Botryosphaeriales
- Family: Botryosphaeriaceae
- Genus: Phyllosticta
- Species: P. perseae

Binomial name
- Phyllosticta perseae Ellis & G. Martin, (1885)

Species of fungus

Phyllosticta perseae is a fungal plant pathogen infecting avocados.
