= Phyllosticta pseudocapsici =

Scientific classification
- Kingdom: Fungi
- Division: Ascomycota
- Class: Dothideomycetes
- Order: Botryosphaeriales
- Family: Botryosphaeriaceae
- Genus: Phyllosticta
- Species: P. pseudocapsici

Binomial name
- Phyllosticta pseudocapsici Roum., (1882)

Species of fungus

Phyllosticta pseudocapsici is a fungal plant pathogen infecting Jerusalem cherries.
