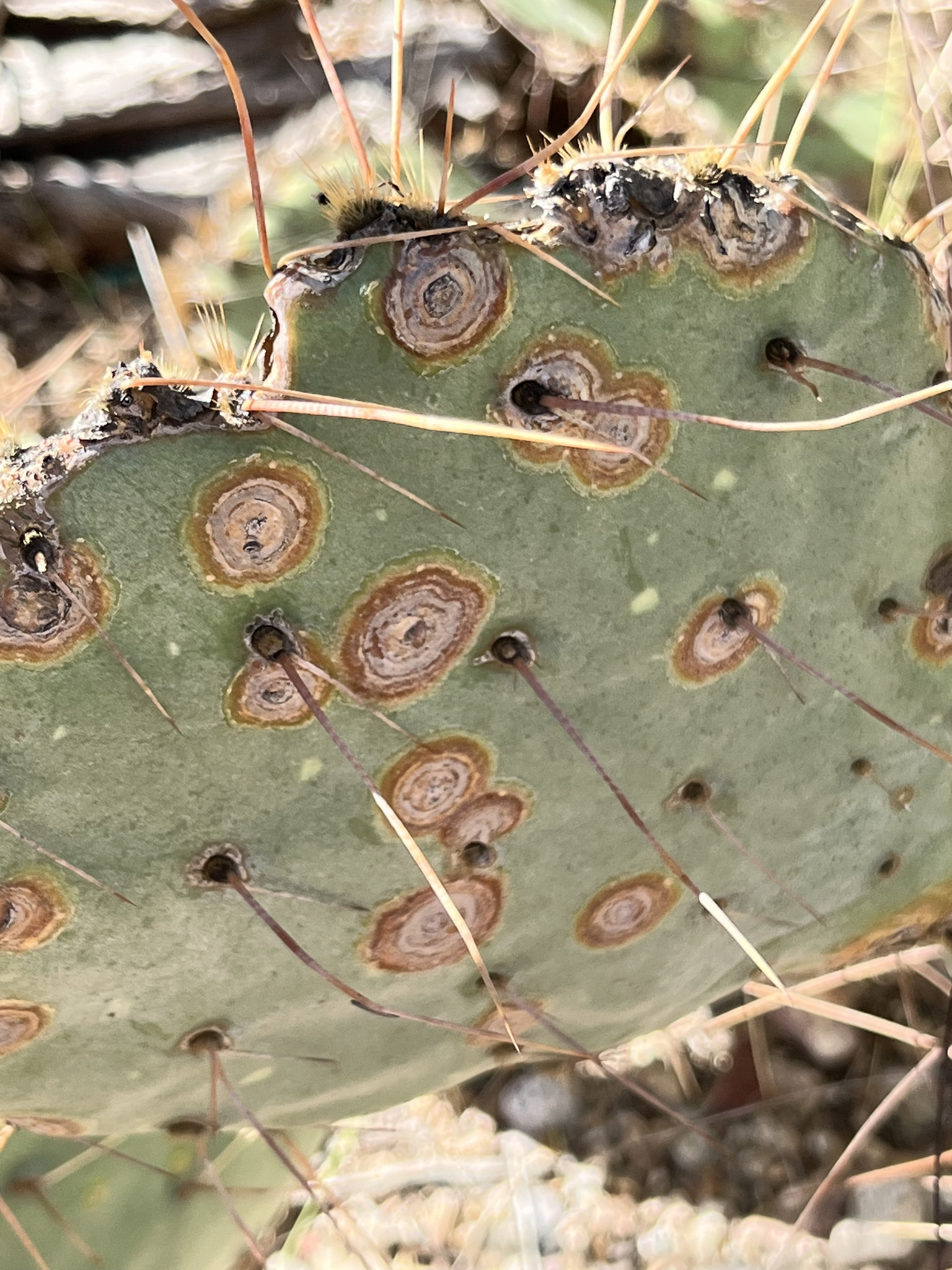
- Saguaro National Park, Arizona, United States

Scientific classification
- Kingdom: Fungi
- Division: Ascomycota
- Class: Dothideomycetes
- Order: Botryosphaeriales
- Family: Botryosphaeriaceae
- Genus: Phyllosticta
- Species: P. concava

Binomial name
- Phyllosticta concava Seaver (1922)

= Phyllosticta concava =

Species of fungus

Phyllosticta concava, also known as opuntia dry rot or prickly pear brown spot, is a species of fungus that infects opuntia cactus, leaving discolored circular depressions in the pads. The species was first formally described by the mycologist Fred Jay Seaver in 1922.
