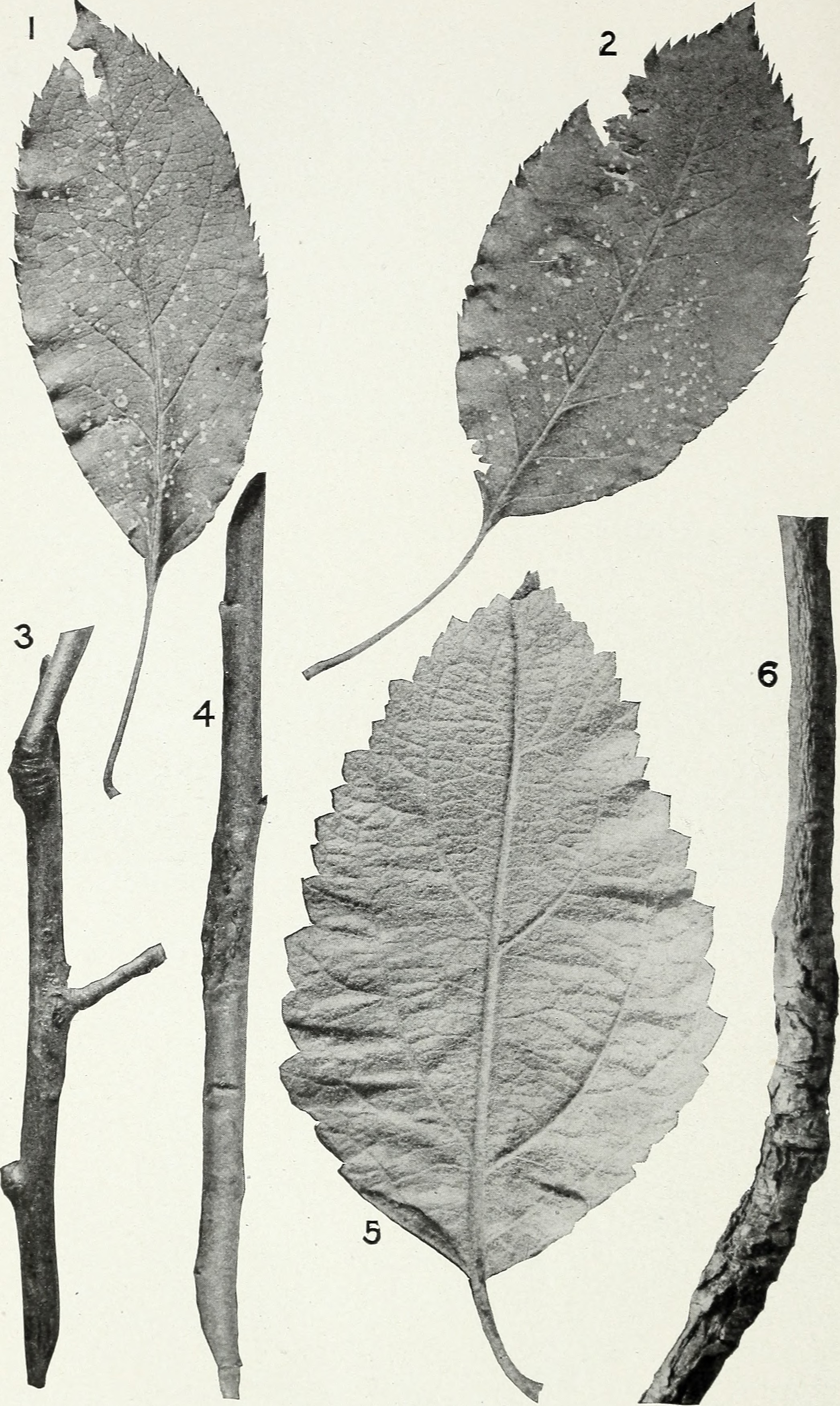
- Apple Leaves and Twigs Showing Blotch. 1 and 2, Leaves of the Arkansas Black variety, with spots caused by the blotch fungus; 3, 1-year-old blotch canker on Ben Davis apple twig; 4, 2-year-old blotch canker on Ben Davis apple twig; 5, leaf of the Missouri variety, showing lesions on petiole and midrib produced by artificial inoculation with spores of Phyllosticta solitaria from pure cultures; 6, an older blotch canker on a Ben Davis twig

Scientific classification
- Kingdom: Fungi
- Division: Ascomycota
- Class: Dothideomycetes
- Order: Botryosphaeriales
- Family: Botryosphaeriaceae
- Genus: Phyllosticta
- Species: P. solitaria

Binomial name
- Phyllosticta solitaria Ellis & Everh. (1895)

Synonyms
- Phyllostictina solitaria (Ellis & Everh.) Shear

= Phyllosticta solitaria =

Species of fungus

Phyllosticta solitaria is a fungal plant pathogen infecting apples.
