= Phyllosticta coffeicola =

Scientific classification
- Kingdom: Fungi
- Division: Ascomycota
- Class: Dothideomycetes
- Order: Botryosphaeriales
- Family: Botryosphaeriaceae
- Genus: Phyllosticta
- Species: P. coffeicola

Binomial name
- Phyllosticta coffeicola Speg. (1896)

Species of fungus

Phyllosticta coffeicola is a fungal plant pathogen infecting coffee.
