= Phyllosticta nicotianae =

Scientific classification
- Kingdom: Fungi
- Division: Ascomycota
- Class: Dothideomycetes
- Order: Botryosphaeriales
- Family: Botryosphaeriaceae
- Genus: Phyllosticta
- Species: P. nicotianae

Binomial name
- Phyllosticta nicotianae Ellis & Everh.

Species of fungus

Phyllosticta nicotianae is a plant pathogen infecting tobacco.
