= Phyllosticta hawaiiensis =

Scientific classification
- Kingdom: Fungi
- Division: Ascomycota
- Class: Dothideomycetes
- Order: Botryosphaeriales
- Family: Botryosphaeriaceae
- Genus: Phyllosticta
- Species: P. hawaiiensis

Binomial name
- Phyllosticta hawaiiensis Petr. (1953)

Species of fungus

Phyllosticta hawaiiensis is a fungal plant pathogen infecting sugarcane.
