= Phyllosticta carpogena =

Scientific classification
- Kingdom: Fungi
- Division: Ascomycota
- Class: Dothideomycetes
- Order: Botryosphaeriales
- Family: Botryosphaeriaceae
- Genus: Phyllosticta
- Species: P. carpogena

Binomial name
- Phyllosticta carpogena Shear

Species of fungus

Phyllosticta carpogena is a fungal plant pathogen infecting caneberries.
