= Phyllosticta sojaecola =

Scientific classification
- Kingdom: Fungi
- Division: Ascomycota
- Class: Dothideomycetes
- Order: Botryosphaeriales
- Family: Botryosphaeriaceae
- Genus: Phyllosticta
- Species: P. sojaecola

Binomial name
- Phyllosticta sojaecola C. Massal., (1900)

Species of fungus

Phyllosticta sojaecola is a plant pathogen infecting soybean.

== Hosts and symptoms ==
Causes Phyllosticta Leaf Spot on soybeans. Forms circular lesions with reddish-brown borders and light brown center. The center of the lesion will drop out over time. Visible pycnidia can be seen in older lesions. A common consequence of infection is reduced yield from the damaged leaves.

== Disease cycle ==
Phyllosticta sojicola and all other members of the Phyllosticta genus are ascomycete fungi, with pathogenic species forming spots on leaves and some fruit. Phyllosticta sojicola emerges from infected plant debris in spring and spread by wind and rain-splash onto healthy plants. While the infection method for Phyllosticta sojicola are unknown, other Phyllosticta species are known to infect leaves via an appressorium in a process that requires adequate moisture. Within mature lesions, the fungus forms pycnidia to overwinter and repeat the cycle. Phyllosticta sojicola can also survive on seeds and infect new fields through infected seed.

== Environment and management ==
Phyllosticta sojicola prefers cool, moist conditions, as pycnidia require moist conditions to germinate. The pathogen can be managed by rotating to non-hosts and using tillage to remove infected residue. As infected seed can transmit the pathogen, seed testing is recommended to prevent introduction of disease.

== See also ==
- List of soybean diseases
