= Phyllosticta capitalensis =

Scientific classification
- Kingdom: Fungi
- Division: Ascomycota
- Class: Dothideomycetes
- Order: Botryosphaeriales
- Family: Botryosphaeriaceae
- Genus: Phyllosticta
- Species: P. capitalensis

Binomial name
- Phyllosticta capitalensis Henn., (1908)

Synonyms
- Phyllostictina pyriformis E.K.Cash & A.M.J.Watson (1955) synonyms Guignardia endophyllicola Okane, Nakagiri & Tad. Ito (2001)

Species of fungus

Phyllosticta capitalensis is a cosmopolitan fungal plant pathogen that grows on many hosts either as an endophyte or as a saprobe on dead tissue, including species of Citrus and Musa (bananas). There are some reports of it infecting orchids, such as cattleyas or Cymbidium.
