= Phyllosticta muscadinii =

Scientific classification
- Kingdom: Fungi
- Division: Ascomycota
- Class: Dothideomycetes
- Order: Botryosphaeriales
- Family: Botryosphaeriaceae
- Genus: Phyllosticta
- Species: P. muscadinii

Binomial name
- Phyllosticta muscadinii (Luttr.) Wulandari

Synonyms
- Guignardia bidwellii f. muscadinii Luttr.

Fungal plant pathogen

Phyllosticta muscadinii is a plant pathogen.
