= Phyllosticta mortonii =

Scientific classification
- Kingdom: Fungi
- Division: Ascomycota
- Class: Dothideomycetes
- Order: Botryosphaeriales
- Family: Botryosphaeriaceae
- Genus: Phyllosticta
- Species: P. mortonii

Binomial name
- Phyllosticta mortonii Fairm. (1913)

Species of fungus

Phyllosticta mortonii is a fungal plant pathogen infecting mangoes.
