= Phyllosticta alliariaefoliae =

Scientific classification
- Kingdom: Fungi
- Division: Ascomycota
- Class: Dothideomycetes
- Order: Botryosphaeriales
- Family: Botryosphaeriaceae
- Genus: Phyllosticta
- Species: P. alliariaefoliae

Binomial name
- Phyllosticta alliariaefoliae Allesch.

Species of fungus

Phyllosticta alliariaefoliae is a fungal plant pathogen infecting bellflowers (Campanula carpatica).
