= Phyllosticta cucurbitacearum =

Scientific classification
- Kingdom: Fungi
- Division: Ascomycota
- Class: Dothideomycetes
- Order: Botryosphaeriales
- Family: Botryosphaeriaceae
- Genus: Phyllosticta
- Species: P. cucurbitacearum

Binomial name
- Phyllosticta cucurbitacearum Sacc. (1878)

Species of fungus

Phyllosticta cucurbitacearum, commonly called "Phyllosticta leaf spot", is a fungal plant pathogen affecting cucurbits.
