= Phyllosticta concentrica =

Scientific classification
- Kingdom: Fungi
- Division: Ascomycota
- Class: Dothideomycetes
- Order: Botryosphaeriales
- Family: Botryosphaeriaceae
- Genus: Phyllosticta
- Species: P. concentrica

Binomial name
- Phyllosticta concentrica Sacc., (1876)

Synonyms
- Phyllosticta ilicicola Pass., (1885); Phyllosticta maxima Ellis & Everh. Phyllostictina concentrica (Sacc.) Höhn., (1920); Phyllostictina concentrica (Sacc.) Höhn., (1919); Phyllostictina maxima (Ellis & Everh.) Petr., (1934); Phyllostictina taxi (Fr.) Wollenw. & Hochapfel, (1941); Sphaeria taxi Fr.

Species of fungus

Phyllosticta concentrica is a fungal plant pathogen.

== See also ==
- List of foliage plant diseases (Araliaceae)
