= Phyllosticta arachidis-hypogaeae =

Scientific classification
- Kingdom: Fungi
- Division: Ascomycota
- Class: Dothideomycetes
- Order: Botryosphaeriales
- Family: Botryosphaeriaceae
- Genus: Phyllosticta
- Species: P. arachidis-hypogaeae

Binomial name
- Phyllosticta arachidis-hypogaeae V.G.Rao (1963)

Species of fungus

Phyllosticta arachidis-hypogaeae is a fungal plant pathogen infecting peanuts.
