= Phyllosticta circumscissa =

Scientific classification
- Kingdom: Fungi
- Division: Ascomycota
- Class: Dothideomycetes
- Order: Botryosphaeriales
- Family: Botryosphaeriaceae
- Genus: Phyllosticta
- Species: P. circumscissa

Binomial name
- Phyllosticta circumscissa Cooke (1883)

Species of fungus

Phyllosticta circumscissa is a plant pathogen, specifically a fungus (micromycete). It affects stone fruit treats predominantly.
