= Phyllosticta minima =

Scientific classification
- Domain: Eukaryota
- Kingdom: Fungi
- Division: Ascomycota
- Class: Dothideomycetes
- Order: Botryosphaeriales
- Family: Botryosphaeriaceae
- Genus: Phyllosticta
- Species: P. minima

Binomial name
- Phyllosticta minima (Berk. & M.A. Curtis) Underw. & Earle

Species of fungus

Phyllosticta minima is a fungus of the division Ascomycota which causes purple-bordered leaf spot, a largely cosmetic disease that infects maple trees. It grows on living and fallen leaves, creating tan, ovular lesions 1/4 inch in diameter and ringed with 'purple' or black spores.

== Signs and symptoms ==
The signs and symptoms are close in proximity. The disease creates small circular dead patches (a sign), which are tan to brown with purple or colored edges. There are little black dots which gather in these lesions; these are the pycnidia which release conidia, the polycyclic and asexual stage of the fungus.

== Life cycle ==
The fungus overwinters as spores in leaf litter. In the spring, wind and rain carry the spores upward. When they land on leaves, they begin to grow, creating asexual pycnidia (also called conidiophores) which hold conidia. The conidia disperse and this cycle continues for the duration of the season, producing and spreading more and more conidia, until leaves carrying the spores fall and lack of resources or stress causes the spores to settle in for the winter.

== Disease management ==
Purple-bordered leaf spot is primarily cosmetic, especially on mature or vigorous trees. However, the disease can defoliate trees early in the growing season. Although they often are able to grow new leaves within a few weeks, this strains the tree, so it is important to water and (if desired) fertilize, so the tree has the nutrients it needs to overcome this stress. If the purple-bordered leaf spot is persistent for several years or adversely affecting a young tree, a fungicide containing copper, neem oil, sulfur, chlorothalonil or thiophanate-methyl can help manage the fungus. The best form of management is planting resistant strains (purple-bordered leaf spot most heavily infects Amur, Japanese, red, silver and sugar maples). Additionally, it is important to remove, burn or bury leaf litter from infected trees in the fall or early spring, as this is where the spores overwinter.
