= Phyllosticta theicola =

Scientific classification
- Kingdom: Fungi
- Division: Ascomycota
- Class: Dothideomycetes
- Order: Botryosphaeriales
- Family: Botryosphaeriaceae
- Genus: Phyllosticta
- Species: P. theicola

Binomial name
- Phyllosticta theicola Curzi, (1926)

Species of fungus

Phyllosticta theicola is a fungal plant pathogen infecting tea.
