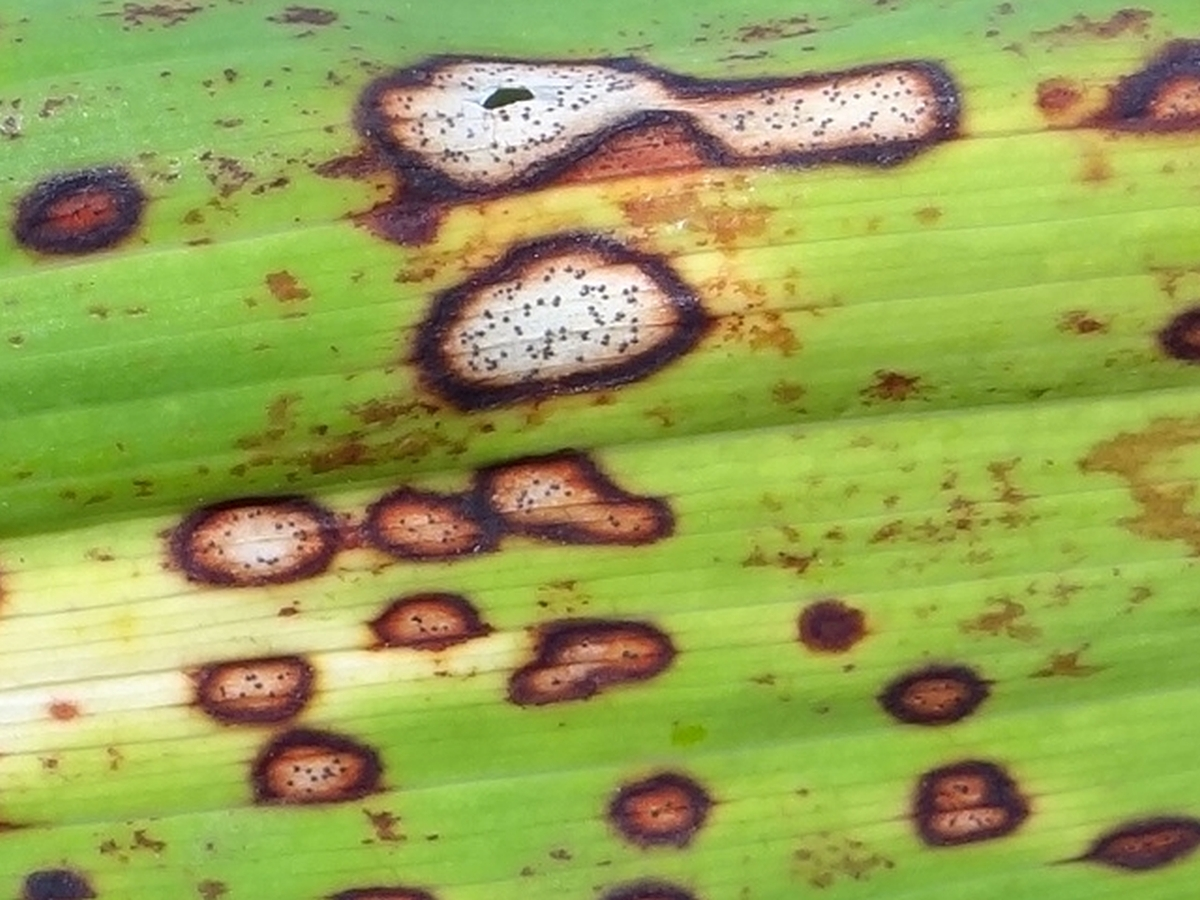
- Phyllosticta cruenta on Polygonatum odoratum found in Ryczów, Silesian Voivodeship, Poland

Scientific classification
- Kingdom: Fungi
- Division: Ascomycota
- Class: Dothideomycetes
- Order: Botryosphaeriales
- Family: Botryosphaeriaceae
- Genus: Phyllosticta; Pers.

Species
- See text

= Phyllosticta =

Genus of fungi

Phyllosticta is a genus of fungi. Many of the species in this genus are common and important plant pathogens. They typically infect the foliage and cause tannish-gray leaf spots with dark brown to purple borders. However, Phyllosticta may also infect fruit and stems. Yield loss is a common consequence of Phyllosticta infection. Representatives of the genus are found worldwide and on a wide range of plant hosts.

== History ==
Phyllosticta was introduced by German mycologist Persoon in 1818 and species Phyllosticta convallariae Pers. was designated as the type species (Donk 1968). Since Phyllosticta is distinct from other genera in that family, Seaver (1922) treated it in the family Phyllostictaceae Fr. of the order Phyllostictites. Nevertheless, Phyllosticta was accommodated in the family Botryosphaeriaceae Theiss. & Syd. (in order Botryosphaeriales C.L. Schoch et al.) in several major studies (e.g. Crous et al. 2006; Schoch et al. 2006; Liu et al. 2012). However, the phylogenetic analyses by Wikee et al. (2013a) allocated Phyllosticta in a clade sister to Botryosphaeriaceae. As a result, the genus was accepted in the family Phyllostictaceae, in the order Botryosphaeriales.

A total of 3,213 names are documented for Phyllosticta in the Index Fungorum (accessed on 31 March 2022) (Hongsanan et al. 2020; Wijayawardene et al. 2020). However, many of these names have been synonymised (van der Aa and Vanev 2002). In 2022, 1499 species are accepted in the genus (Bánki et al. 2022).

== Species ==
- Phyllosticta aberiae
- Phyllosticta abietis
- Phyllosticta abortiva
- Phyllosticta abramovii
- Phyllosticta abricola
- Phyllosticta abutilonis
- Phyllosticta acaciicola
- Phyllosticta acanthopanacis
- Phyllosticta acanthospermi
- Phyllosticta acanthosyridis
- Phyllosticta acericola
- Phyllosticta acerina
- Phyllosticta aceris
- Phyllosticta aceris-obtusati
- Phyllosticta acetosae
- Phyllosticta acicola
- Phyllosticta aconiti
- Phyllosticta aconitifoliicola
- Phyllosticta aconitina
- Phyllosticta acori
- Phyllosticta acoridii
- Phyllosticta acrocomiicola
- Phyllosticta actinidiae
- Phyllosticta adeloica
- Phyllosticta adenocaulontis
- Phyllosticta adenostylis
- Phyllosticta adjuncta
- Phyllosticta adoxae
- Phyllosticta adusta
- Phyllosticta advena
- Phyllosticta advenula
- Phyllosticta aecidiicola
- Phyllosticta aecidiorum
- Phyllosticta aegiphilofolia
- Phyllosticta aegiphilotolia
- Phyllosticta aesculana
- Phyllosticta aesculi
- Phyllosticta aesculina
- Phyllosticta aethilis
- Phyllosticta aetoxici
- Phyllosticta affinis
- Phyllosticta africanae
- Phyllosticta afrostyracis
- Phyllosticta agarwalii
- Phyllosticta agaves
- Phyllosticta aggregata
- Phyllosticta agnostoica
- Phyllosticta agrifolia
- Phyllosticta agrimoniae
- Phyllosticta ahmadii
- Phyllosticta ailanthi
- Phyllosticta aizoon
- Phyllosticta ajugae
- Phyllosticta ajugaecola
- Phyllosticta ajugicola
- Phyllosticta akaisiana
- Phyllosticta akebiae
- Phyllosticta alangii
- Phyllosticta alaterni
- Phyllosticta albanica
- Phyllosticta albina
- Phyllosticta albizinae
- Phyllosticta albobrunnea
- Phyllosticta albomaculans
- Phyllosticta alchemillae
- Phyllosticta alcides
- Phyllosticta aleuritis
- Phyllosticta alii-saikiae
- Phyllosticta alismatis
- Phyllosticta allantella
- Phyllosticta allantospora
- Phyllosticta allegheniensis
- Phyllosticta allescheri
- Phyllosticta allescheriana
- Phyllosticta alliacea
- Phyllosticta alliariaefoliae
- Phyllosticta allii
- Phyllosticta alliicola
- Phyllosticta allii-rotundi
- Phyllosticta allophyli
- Phyllosticta alnea
- Phyllosticta alnicola
- Phyllosticta alnigena
- Phyllosticta alni-glutinosae
- Phyllosticta alniperda
- Phyllosticta alocasiae
- Phyllosticta aloës
- Phyllosticta aloidis
- Phyllosticta alopecuri
- Phyllosticta aloysiae
- Phyllosticta alpigena
- Phyllosticta alpina
- Phyllosticta alpiniae
- Phyllosticta alpiniae-kelungensis
- Phyllosticta alpinicola
- Phyllosticta alsophilae
- Phyllosticta altaica
- Phyllosticta alternantherae
- Phyllosticta althaeicola
- Phyllosticta althaeina
- Phyllosticta alugicola
- Phyllosticta alysciae
- Phyllosticta alyssae
- Phyllosticta alyxiae
- Phyllosticta amaltasia
- Phyllosticta amaranthi
- Phyllosticta amaryllidicola
- Phyllosticta amaryllidis
- Phyllosticta amazonica
- Phyllosticta ambigua
- Phyllosticta ambiguella
- Phyllosticta ambrosiae
- Phyllosticta ambrosioidis
- Phyllosticta americana
- Phyllosticta americanicola
- Phyllosticta amicta
- Phyllosticta amorphae
- Phyllosticta amorphophallicola
- Phyllosticta ampelophila
- Phyllosticta ampelopsidis
- Phyllosticta amphigena
- Phyllosticta amphipterygii
- Phyllosticta ampla
- Phyllosticta amsoniae
- Phyllosticta anacardiacearum
- Phyllosticta anacardiicola
- Phyllosticta anagallidis
- Phyllosticta ananassae
- Phyllosticta anceps
- Phyllosticta andromedae
- Phyllosticta andropogonivora
- Phyllosticta anemones
- Phyllosticta anemonicola
- Phyllosticta angelicicola
- Phyllosticta angulata
- Phyllosticta anibae
- Phyllosticta annonae
- Phyllosticta annonae-squamosae
- Phyllosticta annonarum
- Phyllosticta annonicola
- Phyllosticta annulicaudata
- Phyllosticta anogeissi
- Phyllosticta anserinae
- Phyllosticta antennariae
- Phyllosticta anthoxella
- Phyllosticta anthrophylli
- Phyllosticta anthuriophylla
- Phyllosticta anthyllidis
- Phyllosticta antilleana
- Phyllosticta apatela
- Phyllosticta apiahyna
- Phyllosticta apicalis
- Phyllosticta apiculata
- Phyllosticta apii
- Phyllosticta apiosis-fortunei
- Phyllosticta aplectri
- Phyllosticta apocyni
- Phyllosticta apocyni-androsaemifolii
- Phyllosticta aporoica
- Phyllosticta aposeridis
- Phyllosticta aquatica
- Phyllosticta aquifolina
- Phyllosticta aquilegiae
- Phyllosticta aquilegicola
- Phyllosticta araceae
- Phyllosticta aracearum
- Phyllosticta arachidis
- Phyllosticta arachidis-hypogaeae
- Phyllosticta aracicola
- Phyllosticta araliae
- Phyllosticta araliae-cordatae
- Phyllosticta araliana
- Phyllosticta araratiana
- Phyllosticta aratae
- Phyllosticta araucariae
- Phyllosticta araucariaecola
- Phyllosticta araucariicola
- Phyllosticta arborea
- Phyllosticta arbuti
- Phyllosticta arbuticola
- Phyllosticta arbutifolia
- Phyllosticta arbuti-unedonis
- Phyllosticta arctostaphyli
- Phyllosticta ardisiae
- Phyllosticta ardisiicola
- Phyllosticta arecae
- Phyllosticta arenariae
- Phyllosticta arethusa
- Phyllosticta argentinae
- Phyllosticta argyrea
- Phyllosticta ariaefoliae
- Phyllosticta aricola
- Phyllosticta arida
- Phyllosticta ariopsidis
- Phyllosticta arisaematis
- Phyllosticta arisari
- Phyllosticta arisaricola
- Phyllosticta aristolochiae
- Phyllosticta aristoteliae
- Phyllosticta armeniaca
- Phyllosticta armenicola
- Phyllosticta armeriae
- Phyllosticta armitageana
- Phyllosticta armoraciae
- Phyllosticta arnicae
- Phyllosticta aromatica
- Phyllosticta aromatophila
- Phyllosticta aronici
- Phyllosticta artabotrydicola
- Phyllosticta artemisiae-lactiflorae
- Phyllosticta arthrophylli
- Phyllosticta artocarpi
- Phyllosticta artocarpicola
- Phyllosticta artocarpina
- Phyllosticta arunci
- Phyllosticta aruncicola
- Phyllosticta aruncina
- Phyllosticta arxii
- Phyllosticta asari
- Phyllosticta asclepiadearum
- Phyllosticta ashtonii
- Phyllosticta asiatica
- Phyllosticta asiminae
- Phyllosticta asperulae
- Phyllosticta aspidiospermatis
- Phyllosticta aspidistrae
- Phyllosticta aspidistricola
- Phyllosticta aspidopterygis
- Phyllosticta aspidospermatis
- Phyllosticta asplenii
- Phyllosticta associata
- Phyllosticta astericola
- Phyllosticta asterisci
- Phyllosticta asteromoides
- Phyllosticta astilbes
- Phyllosticta astragali
- Phyllosticta astragalicola
- Phyllosticta astrantiaecola
- Phyllosticta atomata
- Phyllosticta atractyli
- Phyllosticta atriplicicola
- Phyllosticta atriplicis
- Phyllosticta atromaculans
- Phyllosticta atropae
- Phyllosticta atropina
- Phyllosticta atrozonata
- Phyllosticta aucubae
- Phyllosticta aucubicola
- Phyllosticta aucupariae
- Phyllosticta auerswaldii
- Phyllosticta aurantiaca
- Phyllosticta aurantiicola
- Phyllosticta aurea
- Phyllosticta auriculata
- Phyllosticta australis
- Phyllosticta austriaca
- Phyllosticta autumnalis
- Phyllosticta avenae
- Phyllosticta avenophila
- Phyllosticta axonopi
- Phyllosticta azadii
- Phyllosticta azedarachis
- Phyllosticta azevinhi
- Phyllosticta azukiae
- Phyllosticta babajaniae
- Phyllosticta babylonicae
- Phyllosticta baccharidis
- Phyllosticta bacillaris
- Phyllosticta bacilliformis
- Phyllosticta bacillispora
- Phyllosticta bacilloides
- Phyllosticta bacteriiformis
- Phyllosticta bacterioides
- Phyllosticta bacteriosperma
- Phyllosticta badhamii
- Phyllosticta bakeri
- Phyllosticta balcanica
- Phyllosticta baldensis
- Phyllosticta baldratii
- Phyllosticta ballotae
- Phyllosticta balloticola
- Phyllosticta balsaminae
- Phyllosticta bambusina
- Phyllosticta bambusinifolia
- Phyllosticta banatica
- Phyllosticta banksiae
- Phyllosticta baphiae
- Phyllosticta barleriae
- Phyllosticta barnadesiae
- Phyllosticta barssii
- Phyllosticta basilici
- Phyllosticta batatas
- Phyllosticta bauhiniae
- Phyllosticta bauhiniae-reticulatae
- Phyllosticta bauhinicola
- Phyllosticta bauhiniicola
- Phyllosticta beaumarisii
- Phyllosticta begoniae
- Phyllosticta begoniaecola
- Phyllosticta begoniicola
- Phyllosticta beguinotiana
- Phyllosticta belgradensis
- Phyllosticta bellidicola
- Phyllosticta bellidis
- Phyllosticta beltranii
- Phyllosticta benedicti
- Phyllosticta berberidicola
- Phyllosticta berberidis
- Phyllosticta bergeniae
- Phyllosticta berlesiana
- Phyllosticta berlesiana
- Phyllosticta berolinensis
- Phyllosticta berteroae
- Phyllosticta bertholletiae
- Phyllosticta betonica
- Phyllosticta betonicae
- Phyllosticta betonicae
- Phyllosticta betulae
- Phyllosticta betulae
- Phyllosticta betulicola
- Phyllosticta betulicola
- Phyllosticta bicolor
- Phyllosticta biformis
- Phyllosticta biformis
- Phyllosticta biformis
- Phyllosticta bifrenariae
- Phyllosticta bignoniae
- Phyllosticta bignoniicola
- Phyllosticta bischofiae
- Phyllosticta bixina
- Phyllosticta bizzozeriana
- Phyllosticta blackwoodiae
- Phyllosticta bletiae
- Phyllosticta boehmeriae
- Phyllosticta boehmeriicola
- Phyllosticta boerhaviae
- Phyllosticta boerhaviae
- Phyllosticta bokensis
- Phyllosticta bolleana
- Phyllosticta bolleana
- Phyllosticta boltoniae
- Phyllosticta bombacis
- Phyllosticta bombayensis
- Phyllosticta bonanseae
- Phyllosticta bonanseana
- Phyllosticta bonariensis
- Phyllosticta bondarzevii
- Phyllosticta bonduc
- Phyllosticta borinquensis
- Phyllosticta bosensis
- Phyllosticta botrychii
- Phyllosticta botrychii
- Phyllosticta botrychii
- Phyllosticta bougainvilleae
- Phyllosticta bougainvilleae
- Phyllosticta bougainvilleicola
- Phyllosticta boussingaultiae
- Phyllosticta brachypodii
- Phyllosticta brachypodii
- Phyllosticta brachypodii
- Phyllosticta bractearum
- Phyllosticta bracteophila
- Phyllosticta brasiliensis
- Phyllosticta brassicae-oleraceae'
- Phyllosticta brassicina
- Phyllosticta brazilianae
- Phyllosticta bresadolae
- Phyllosticta bresadolana
- Phyllosticta briardii
- Phyllosticta briardii
- Phyllosticta briardii
- Phyllosticta brideliae
- Phyllosticta bridgesii
- Phyllosticta briosiana
- Phyllosticta bromeliae
- Phyllosticta bromeliicola
- Phyllosticta bromi
- Phyllosticta bromiicola
- Phyllosticta bromivora
- Phyllosticta brosimi
- Phyllosticta broussonetiae
- Phyllosticta bruchiana
- Phyllosticta brunellae
- Phyllosticta brunfelsiae
- Phyllosticta brunnea
- Phyllosticta bryophila
- Phyllosticta bubakiana
- Phyllosticta bubakiana
- Phyllosticta bucklandiae
- Phyllosticta buddlejae
- Phyllosticta buddlejicola
- Phyllosticta buddlejicola
- Phyllosticta bufonii
- Phyllosticta bumeliae
- Phyllosticta bumeliifolia
- Phyllosticta buphthalmi
- Phyllosticta bupleuri
- Phyllosticta bupleuri
- Phyllosticta bupleuri
- Phyllosticta bupleuricola
- Phyllosticta buteae
- Phyllosticta butleri
- Phyllosticta buxicola
- Phyllosticta buxicola
- Phyllosticta buxina
- Phyllosticta caatingae
- Phyllosticta caballeroi
- Phyllosticta cacaliae
- Phyllosticta cajani
- Phyllosticta cajani
- Phyllosticta cajanicola
- Phyllosticta calabrica
- Phyllosticta caladii
- Phyllosticta calami
- Phyllosticta calami
- Phyllosticta calaminthae
- Phyllosticta calaritana
- Phyllosticta calathaeae
- Phyllosticta calatheae
- Phyllosticta calceolariae
- Phyllosticta calophylli
- Phyllosticta calopogoniorum
- Phyllosticta calthae
- Phyllosticta calthae
- Phyllosticta calycanthi
- Phyllosticta calycanthicola
- Phyllosticta calystegiae
- Phyllosticta camelliae
- Phyllosticta camelliaecola
- Phyllosticta camelliaecola
- Phyllosticta camelliaecola
- Phyllosticta campanulae
- Phyllosticta campanulae-latifoliae
- Phyllosticta campanulicola
- Phyllosticta campanulina
- Phyllosticta campestris
- Phyllosticta camphorae
- Phyllosticta camusiana
- Phyllosticta canangae
- Phyllosticta canavaliae
- Phyllosticta canavaliae
- Phyllosticta candicans
- Phyllosticta canescens
- Phyllosticta cannicola
- Phyllosticta capitalensis
- Phyllosticta capparearum
- Phyllosticta capparicola
- Phyllosticta capparis
- Phyllosticta capparis
- Phyllosticta capparis-heyneanae
- Phyllosticta caprifolii
- Phyllosticta capsellae
- Phyllosticta capsellae
- Phyllosticta capsici
- Phyllosticta capsulicola
- Phyllosticta caraganae
- Phyllosticta caraganae
- Phyllosticta caranoi
- Phyllosticta cardamines
- Phyllosticta cardamines-amarae
- Phyllosticta cardiocrini
- Phyllosticta cardiospermi
- Phyllosticta careyae
- Phyllosticta cariae
- Phyllosticta caricae
- Phyllosticta caricaecola
- Phyllosticta caricae-papayae
- Phyllosticta caricicola
- Phyllosticta caricicola
- Phyllosticta caricicola
- Phyllosticta caricis
- Phyllosticta carissae
- Phyllosticta carlinae
- Phyllosticta carniolica
- Phyllosticta carpathica
- Phyllosticta carpinea
- Phyllosticta carpini
- Phyllosticta carpogena
- Phyllosticta carthami
- Phyllosticta carthami
- Phyllosticta carthami
- Phyllosticta caryae
- Phyllosticta caryae
- Phyllosticta caryae
- Phyllosticta caryae
- Phyllosticta caryicola
- Phyllosticta caryigena
- Phyllosticta caryigena
- Phyllosticta caryigena
- Phyllosticta caryogena
- Phyllosticta caryotae
- Phyllosticta caryotae
- Phyllosticta casaresi
- Phyllosticta casaresi
- Phyllosticta casaresi
- Phyllosticta casimiroae
- Phyllosticta casinalbensis
- Phyllosticta cassavae
- Phyllosticta cassiae
- Phyllosticta cassiae-goratensis
- Phyllosticta cassiae-occidentalis
- Phyllosticta cassiae-torae
- Phyllosticta cassiicola
- Phyllosticta castaneae
- Phyllosticta castaneperda
- Phyllosticta castanopsidis
- Phyllosticta catalpae
- Phyllosticta catalpicola
- Phyllosticta catappae
- Phyllosticta catechu
- Phyllosticta cathartici
- Phyllosticta caucasica
- Phyllosticta caulicola
- Phyllosticta cavarae
- Phyllosticta ceanothi
- Phyllosticta cearensis
- Phyllosticta cedrelae
- Phyllosticta ceeratoniae
- Phyllosticta cejpii
- Phyllosticta celastri
- Phyllosticta celastricola
- Phyllosticta celastrina
- Phyllosticta celosiae
- Phyllosticta celtidicola
- Phyllosticta celtidis
- Phyllosticta centaureae
- Phyllosticta centaureae-scabiosae
- Phyllosticta centifoliae
- Phyllosticta cepae
- Phyllosticta cephaelidis
- Phyllosticta cephalanthi
- Phyllosticta cephalariae
- Phyllosticta cerasella
- Phyllosticta cerasicola
- Phyllosticta ceratoniae
- Phyllosticta cercidicola
- Phyllosticta cercocarpi
- Phyllosticta cestri
- Phyllosticta cestricola
- Phyllosticta chaenomelicola
- Phyllosticta chaenomelina
- Phyllosticta chaerophylli
- Phyllosticta chamaebuxi
- Phyllosticta chamaenerii
- Phyllosticta chamaeropis
- Phyllosticta chamaeropsis
- Phyllosticta chamissoae
- Phyllosticta chanthavica
- Phyllosticta chardonii
- Phyllosticta cheiranthicola
- Phyllosticta cheiranthorum
- Phyllosticta chelidonii
- Phyllosticta chelonanthi
- Phyllosticta chenopodii
- Phyllosticta chenopodii-albi
- Phyllosticta chenopodii-boni-henrici
- Phyllosticta chenopodiicola
- Phyllosticta cherensis
- Phyllosticta cherimoliae
- Phyllosticta chilensis
- Phyllosticta chionanthi
- Phyllosticta chloranthi
- Phyllosticta chlorospila
- Phyllosticta chlorospora
- Phyllosticta chondrillina
- Phyllosticta chorisiae
- Phyllosticta chorizemae
- Phyllosticta christianicola
- Phyllosticta chrysanthemi
- Phyllosticta chrysophylli
- Phyllosticta cicerina
- Phyllosticta cicutae
- Phyllosticta ciferrica
- Phyllosticta cinchonae
- Phyllosticta cinchonicola
- Phyllosticta cinerea
- Phyllosticta cinnamomi
- Phyllosticta cinnamomi-glanduliferi
- Phyllosticta cinnamomi-zeylanici
- Phyllosticta circaeae
- Phyllosticta circinans
- Phyllosticta circuligerens
- Phyllosticta circumscissa
- Phyllosticta circumsepta
- Phyllosticta circumvallata
- Phyllosticta cirratula
- Phyllosticta cirsii
- Phyllosticta cirsii-lanceolati
- Phyllosticta cirsiorum
- Phyllosticta cissampeli
- Phyllosticta cissicola
- Phyllosticta cisti
- Phyllosticta cistina
- Phyllosticta citharexyli
- Phyllosticta citriasiana
- Phyllosticta citriasiatica
- Phyllosticta citribraziliensis
- Phyllosticta citricola
- Phyllosticta cladrastidis
- Phyllosticta clematidicola
- Phyllosticta clematidis
- Phyllosticta clerodendri
- Phyllosticta clethrae
- Phyllosticta clethricola
- Phyllosticta clitoridicola
- Phyllosticta cliviae
- Phyllosticta clusiae
- Phyllosticta clusiae-roseae
- Phyllosticta clypeata
- Phyllosticta cneori
- Phyllosticta cobaeae
- Phyllosticta coccineae
- Phyllosticta coccolobae
- Phyllosticta coccolobaecola
- Phyllosticta cocculi
- Phyllosticta cocculi-hirsuti
- Phyllosticta cochlospermi
- Phyllosticta cocoës
- Phyllosticta cocoicola
- Phyllosticta cocoina
- Phyllosticta cocophila
- Phyllosticta codiaeana
- Phyllosticta codiaei
- Phyllosticta codiaeicola
- Phyllosticta codonopsidis
- Phyllosticta coffeae-arabicae
- Phyllosticta coffeae-libericae
- Phyllosticta coffeicida
- Phyllosticta coffeicola
- Phyllosticta coicicola
- Phyllosticta coicis-lacrimae
- Phyllosticta colae
- Phyllosticta colicola
- Phyllosticta collinsoniae
- Phyllosticta colocasiae
- Phyllosticta colocasiae-esculentae
- Phyllosticta colocasiicola
- Phyllosticta colocasiophila
- Phyllosticta colubrinae
- Phyllosticta colutae
- Phyllosticta comanthosphacea
- Phyllosticta combreticola
- Phyllosticta commonsii
- Phyllosticta comoensis
- Phyllosticta comoliae
- Phyllosticta comolliae
- Phyllosticta comoriana
- Phyllosticta concava
- Phyllosticta concentrica
- Phyllosticta concinna
- Phyllosticta concomitans
- Phyllosticta concors
- Phyllosticta confertissima
- Phyllosticta confusa
- Phyllosticta congesta
- Phyllosticta coniothyrioides
- Phyllosticta consimilis
- Phyllosticta convallariae
- Phyllosticta convallariicola
- Phyllosticta convexula
- Phyllosticta convolvulacearum
- Phyllosticta convolvuli
- Phyllosticta cookei
- Phyllosticta cookiae
- Phyllosticta copaiferae
- Phyllosticta coprosmae
- Phyllosticta coralliobola
- Phyllosticta corchori
- Phyllosticta corcontica
- Phyllosticta cordillerana
- Phyllosticta cordobensis
- Phyllosticta cordylines
- Phyllosticta cordylinophila
- Phyllosticta coreopsidis
- Phyllosticta coriandri
- Phyllosticta coriariae
- Phyllosticta coriariicola
- Phyllosticta corni
- Phyllosticta corni-canadensis
- Phyllosticta cornicola
- Phyllosticta corni-controversae
- Phyllosticta cornivora
- Phyllosticta cornuti
- Phyllosticta coronaria
- Phyllosticta coronillae
- Phyllosticta correae
- Phyllosticta corrodens
- Phyllosticta corsineae
- Phyllosticta corydalina
- Phyllosticta corydalis
- Phyllosticta corylaria
- Phyllosticta coryli
- Phyllosticta corylina
- Phyllosticta corynocarpi
- Phyllosticta costesii
- Phyllosticta cotoneastri
- Phyllosticta coumarounae
- Phyllosticta couraliae
- Phyllosticta cousiniae
- Phyllosticta crambes
- Phyllosticta crassicaulis
- Phyllosticta crastophila
- Phyllosticta crataegi
- Phyllosticta crataegicola
- Phyllosticta crenatae
- Phyllosticta crepidis-paludosae
- Phyllosticta crepidophora
- Phyllosticta crini
- Phyllosticta crinodendri
- Phyllosticta crista-galli
- Phyllosticta crotalariae
- Phyllosticta crotonina
- Phyllosticta crotonophila
- Phyllosticta cruenta
- Phyllosticta crustosa
- Phyllosticta crypta
- Phyllosticta cryptocarpa
- Phyllosticta cryptocaryae
- Phyllosticta cryptomeriae
- Phyllosticta cryptosporae
- Phyllosticta cryptostegiae
- Phyllosticta cryptotaeniae
- Phyllosticta cucubali
- Phyllosticta cucurbitacearum
- Phyllosticta cuestae
- Phyllosticta cufiniana
- Phyllosticta cumminsii
- Phyllosticta cunninghamiae
- Phyllosticta cupaniae
- Phyllosticta curatellae
- Phyllosticta curculiginis
- Phyllosticta curcumae
- Phyllosticta curvarispora
- Phyllosticta curvata
- Phyllosticta cuspidatae
- Phyllosticta cuspidaticola
- Phyllosticta cussoniae
- Phyllosticta cyamopsidicola
- Phyllosticta cyamopsidis
- Phyllosticta cyanococci
- Phyllosticta cycadina
- Phyllosticta cycadis
- Phyllosticta cyclaminella
- Phyllosticta cyclaminicola
- Phyllosticta cyclaminis
- Phyllosticta cyclobalanopsidis
- Phyllosticta cydoniae
- Phyllosticta cydoniicola
- Phyllosticta cylindrica
- Phyllosticta cylindrospora
- Phyllosticta cymbidii
- Phyllosticta cymbopogonis
- Phyllosticta cynanchi
- Phyllosticta cynarae
- Phyllosticta cynoglossi
- Phyllosticta cynosuri
- Phyllosticta cyperi
- Phyllosticta cypericola
- Phyllosticta cyrillae
- Phyllosticta cystopteridis
- Phyllosticta cytisella
- Phyllosticta cytisorum
- Phyllosticta dactylidicola
- Phyllosticta dactylidis
- Phyllosticta daemonoropis
- Phyllosticta dahliae
- Phyllosticta dalbergiae
- Phyllosticta dalbergiicola
- Phyllosticta dammarae
- Phyllosticta danaes
- Phyllosticta danthoniae
- Phyllosticta daphnes-ponticae
- Phyllosticta daphniphylli
- Phyllosticta dardanoi
- Phyllosticta datiscae
- Phyllosticta daturae
- Phyllosticta daturicola
- Phyllosticta davisii
- Phyllosticta dearnessii
- Phyllosticta debauxii
- Phyllosticta debeauxii
- Phyllosticta decidua
- Phyllosticta decipiens
- Phyllosticta decolorans
- Phyllosticta decussatae
- Phyllosticta deformans
- Phyllosticta degenerans
- Phyllosticta degenii
- Phyllosticta delhiensis
- Phyllosticta deliciosa
- Phyllosticta delphinii
- Phyllosticta densissima
- Phyllosticta derridis
- Phyllosticta desertorum
- Phyllosticta desmazieri
- Phyllosticta desmodii
- Phyllosticta desmodiicola
- Phyllosticta desmodiiphila
- Phyllosticta destructiva
- Phyllosticta destruens
- Phyllosticta deutziae
- Phyllosticta deutziicola
- Phyllosticta dianellicola
- Phyllosticta dianthi
- Phyllosticta diapensiae
- Phyllosticta dictamni
- Phyllosticta dictamnicola
- Phyllosticta didymopanacis
- Phyllosticta diedickei
- Phyllosticta dieffenbachiae
- Phyllosticta diervillae
- Phyllosticta digerae
- Phyllosticta digitalis
- Phyllosticta digitariae
- Phyllosticta digraphidis
- Phyllosticta dimocarpi
- Phyllosticta dioscoreae
- Phyllosticta dioscoreae-daemonae
- Phyllosticta dioscoreicola
- Phyllosticta dioscoreina
- Phyllosticta diospyri
- Phyllosticta dipsaci
- Phyllosticta diptericicola
- Phyllosticta dircae
- Phyllosticta disciformis
- Phyllosticta discincola
- Phyllosticta discincta
- Phyllosticta discors
- Phyllosticta dispergens
- Phyllosticta divergens
- Phyllosticta diversispora
- Phyllosticta dodecantheae
- Phyllosticta doellingeriae
- Phyllosticta doliariae
- Phyllosticta doliariicola
- Phyllosticta dolichi
- Phyllosticta domestica
- Phyllosticta domingensis
- Phyllosticta donckelaeri
- Phyllosticta doronicella
- Phyllosticta doronici
- Phyllosticta doronicigena
- Phyllosticta doxanthae
- Phyllosticta drabae
- Phyllosticta dracaenae
- Phyllosticta dracaenicola
- Phyllosticta dracocephali
- Phyllosticta draconis
- Phyllosticta drimydis
- Phyllosticta dryandrae
- Phyllosticta drymeiae
- Phyllosticta dryopteridis
- Phyllosticta dryopteris
- Phyllosticta dubia
- Phyllosticta durionis
- Phyllosticta durmitorensis
- Phyllosticta dyerae
- Phyllosticta dysanthi
- Phyllosticta dysoxyli
- Phyllosticta dzumajensis
- Phyllosticta ebuli
- Phyllosticta echinodoricola
- Phyllosticta echinopsis
- Phyllosticta edwardsiae
- Phyllosticta effusa
- Phyllosticta ehrhartii
- Phyllosticta elaeagni
- Phyllosticta elaeidis
- Phyllosticta elaeocarpi
- Phyllosticta elasticae
- Phyllosticta elettariae
- Phyllosticta ellisiana
- Phyllosticta ellisii
- Phyllosticta elodea
- Phyllosticta elodes
- Phyllosticta elongata
- Phyllosticta elymi
- Phyllosticta embeliina
- Phyllosticta emblicae
- Phyllosticta embothryi
- Phyllosticta eminens
- Phyllosticta encephalarti
- Phyllosticta entebbeensis
- Phyllosticta entylomicola
- Phyllosticta ephedrae
- Phyllosticta epichloës
- Phyllosticta epigaea
- Phyllosticta epiglandula
- Phyllosticta epignomonia
- Phyllosticta epilobii
- Phyllosticta epilobii-rosei
- Phyllosticta epimedii
- Phyllosticta epipactidis
- Phyllosticta epiphylla
- Phyllosticta equiseti
- Phyllosticta erechtitis
- Phyllosticta eremostachydis
- Phyllosticta eremuri
- Phyllosticta ericae
- Phyllosticta ericicola
- Phyllosticta erigerontis
- Phyllosticta eriobotryae
- Phyllosticta eriobotryicola
- Phyllosticta eriodendri
- Phyllosticta eriogoni
- Phyllosticta eritraea
- Phyllosticta erodii
- Phyllosticta erratica
- Phyllosticta ervi
- Phyllosticta eryngiana
- Phyllosticta eryngicola
- Phyllosticta eryngiella
- Phyllosticta eryngii
- Phyllosticta erysimi
- Phyllosticta erysimi-cuspidati
- Phyllosticta erysiphoides
- Phyllosticta erythraea
- Phyllosticta erythraeae
- Phyllosticta erythrinae
- Phyllosticta erythrinicola
- Phyllosticta erythronii
- Phyllosticta erythroxyli
- Phyllosticta eschweilerae
- Phyllosticta eucalypti
- Phyllosticta eucalyptica
- Phyllosticta eucalyptorum
- Phyllosticta euchlaenae
- Phyllosticta eucommiae
- Phyllosticta eugeniae
- Phyllosticta euodiae
- Phyllosticta euonymella
- Phyllosticta euonymi
- Phyllosticta euonymicola
- Phyllosticta euonymi-japonici
- Phyllosticta eupatorii
- Phyllosticta eupatoriicola
- Phyllosticta eupatorina
- Phyllosticta euphorbiae
- Phyllosticta euphorbiae-khandalensis
- Phyllosticta euphorbiicola
- Phyllosticta eutrematis
- Phyllosticta everhartii
- Phyllosticta evernia
- Phyllosticta excavata
- Phyllosticta exigua
- Phyllosticta eximia
- Phyllosticta exscapi
- Phyllosticta extensa
- Phyllosticta fabae
- Phyllosticta fagaricola
- Phyllosticta fagi
- Phyllosticta fagicola
- Phyllosticta faginea
- Phyllosticta fagopyri
- Phyllosticta fagopyricola
- Phyllosticta fagopyrina
- Phyllosticta falcariae
- Phyllosticta falcatae
- Phyllosticta falconeri
- Phyllosticta fallax
- Phyllosticta fallopiae
- Phyllosticta faradayae
- Phyllosticta farfarae
- Phyllosticta fatiscens
- Phyllosticta fatsiae
- Phyllosticta fatsiae-japonicae
- Phyllosticta favillensis
- Phyllosticta feijoae
- Phyllosticta feijoicola
- Phyllosticta ferax
- Phyllosticta ferruginea
- Phyllosticta ferulae
- Phyllosticta ficariae
- Phyllosticta fici
- Phyllosticta fici-caricae
- Phyllosticta ficicola
- Phyllosticta fici-elasticae
- Phyllosticta ficina
- Phyllosticta fici-wightianae
- Phyllosticta figuerasii
- Phyllosticta filaginis
- Phyllosticta filipendulae
- Phyllosticta filipendulina
- Phyllosticta fimbriata
- Phyllosticta flacourtiae
- Phyllosticta flacourtiicola
- Phyllosticta flavescentis
- Phyllosticta flavidula
- Phyllosticta flevolandica
- Phyllosticta flexuosa
- Phyllosticta flourensiicola
- Phyllosticta flueckigeriae
- Phyllosticta fomini
- Phyllosticta fourcadei
- Phyllosticta fraganiicola
- Phyllosticta fragariicola
- Phyllosticta fragosoana
- Phyllosticta frangulae
- Phyllosticta frankiana
- Phyllosticta fraserae
- Phyllosticta fraxini
- Phyllosticta fraxinicola
- Phyllosticta fraxinifolia
- Phyllosticta fritillariae
- Phyllosticta fuchsiicola
- Phyllosticta fuliginosa
- Phyllosticta fulvescens
- Phyllosticta fulvomaculans
- Phyllosticta fumariae
- Phyllosticta funkiae
- Phyllosticta furcraeae
- Phyllosticta fusca
- Phyllosticta fuscozonata
- Phyllosticta fusiformis
- Phyllosticta fusispora
- Phyllosticta gageae
- Phyllosticta gaillardiae
- Phyllosticta galactis
- Phyllosticta galegae
- Phyllosticta galeobdoli
- Phyllosticta galeopsidis
- Phyllosticta galinsogae
- Phyllosticta gallarum
- Phyllosticta gallicola
- Phyllosticta galligena
- Phyllosticta galphimiicola
- Phyllosticta garbovskii
- Phyllosticta garciniae
- Phyllosticta gardeniae
- Phyllosticta gardeniicola
- Phyllosticta garrettii
- Phyllosticta garryae
- Phyllosticta garryaecola
- Phyllosticta gastonis
- Phyllosticta gaultheriae
- Phyllosticta gazaniae
- Phyllosticta gei
- Phyllosticta gelonii
- Phyllosticta gelsemii
- Phyllosticta gemmipara
- Phyllosticta gemmiphilae
- Phyllosticta genipae
- Phyllosticta genistae
- Phyllosticta gentianae
- Phyllosticta gentianellae
- Phyllosticta geranii
- Phyllosticta geraniicola
- Phyllosticta gerbeicola
- Phyllosticta gerberae
- Phyllosticta gerbericola
- Phyllosticta germanica
- Phyllosticta ghaesembillae
- Phyllosticta gharsei
- Phyllosticta gigantomaculata
- Phyllosticta gillesii
- Phyllosticta ginkgo
- Phyllosticta glabra
- Phyllosticta gladioli
- Phyllosticta gladioli-minor
- Phyllosticta gladioloides
- Phyllosticta glauca
- Phyllosticta glechomae
- Phyllosticta gleditschiae
- Phyllosticta gliricidiicola
- Phyllosticta globifera
- Phyllosticta globigera
- Phyllosticta globulariae
- Phyllosticta globuli
- Phyllosticta globulosa
- Phyllosticta glochidii
- Phyllosticta gloriosa
- Phyllosticta glumarum
- Phyllosticta glumarum-setariae
- Phyllosticta glumarum-sorghi
- Phyllosticta glycines
- Phyllosticta glycosmidis
- Phyllosticta glycyphylli
- Phyllosticta glycyrrhizae
- Phyllosticta glycyrrhizicola
- Phyllosticta glynneae
- Phyllosticta gmelinae
- Phyllosticta goebeliae
- Phyllosticta goetheae
- Phyllosticta golenkinianthes
- Phyllosticta golovinii
- Phyllosticta gomphranicida
- Phyllosticta gomphrenae
- Phyllosticta gomphrenicola
- Phyllosticta gordoniae
- Phyllosticta gordoniicola
- Phyllosticta goritiensis
- Phyllosticta gossypii
- Phyllosticta gossypina
- Phyllosticta gouaniae
- Phyllosticta gracilis
- Phyllosticta granati
- Phyllosticta grandii
- Phyllosticta grandispora
- Phyllosticta gratiolae
- Phyllosticta grevilleae
- Phyllosticta grewiae
- Phyllosticta grisea
- Phyllosticta griseofusca
- Phyllosticta groenlandica
- Phyllosticta grossulariae
- Phyllosticta guajavae
- Phyllosticta guanicensis
- Phyllosticta guareae
- Phyllosticta guayaci
- Phyllosticta guceviczii
- Phyllosticta gueldenstaedtiae
- Phyllosticta guevinae
- Phyllosticta guevinicola
- Phyllosticta guillielmicola
- Phyllosticta gunnerae
- Phyllosticta gustaviae
- Phyllosticta guttulatae
- Phyllosticta gymnocladi
- Phyllosticta gymnosporiae
- Phyllosticta gymnosporiicola
- Phyllosticta gypsophilae
- Phyllosticta haematocycla
- Phyllosticta hainensis
- Phyllosticta hakeae
- Phyllosticta halduana
- Phyllosticta haleniae
- Phyllosticta halepensis
- Phyllosticta halimodendroni
- Phyllosticta halophila
- Phyllosticta halstediana
- Phyllosticta halstedii
- Phyllosticta hamadryadis
- Phyllosticta hamamelidis
- Phyllosticta hamasensis
- Phyllosticta haraeana
- Phyllosticta harai
- Phyllosticta hardenbergiae
- Phyllosticta hariotiana
- Phyllosticta hasijai
- Phyllosticta hawaiiensis
- Phyllosticta haynaldii
- Phyllosticta healdii
- Phyllosticta hederacea
- Phyllosticta hederae
- Phyllosticta hedericola
- Phyllosticta hedychii
- Phyllosticta hedysari
- Phyllosticta heimiae
- Phyllosticta helenae
- Phyllosticta helianthemi
- Phyllosticta helianthemicola
- Phyllosticta helianthi
- Phyllosticta helichrysicola
- Phyllosticta heliconiae
- Phyllosticta heliconiicola
- Phyllosticta heliopsidis
- Phyllosticta helleborella
- Phyllosticta helleboriana
- Phyllosticta helleboricola
- Phyllosticta helleborina
- Phyllosticta helvetica
- Phyllosticta helvola
- Phyllosticta helwingiae
- Phyllosticta hemerocallidis
- Phyllosticta hemibrunnea
- Phyllosticta henriquesii
- Phyllosticta hepaticae
- Phyllosticta heraclei
- Phyllosticta hesleri
- Phyllosticta hesperidearum
- Phyllosticta hesperidis
- Phyllosticta heteromeles
- Phyllosticta heterophragmatis
- Phyllosticta heterophylli
- Phyllosticta heteropteridis
- Phyllosticta heterospora
- Phyllosticta heucherae
- Phyllosticta heveae
- Phyllosticta heveana
- Phyllosticta heveicola
- Phyllosticta hibisci
- Phyllosticta hibisci-cannabini
- Phyllosticta hibiscicola
- Phyllosticta hibiscina
- Phyllosticta hieracicola
- Phyllosticta hieracii
- Phyllosticta hieraciicola
- Phyllosticta himantoglossi
- Phyllosticta himeranthi
- Phyllosticta hippocastani
- Phyllosticta hiratsukae
- Phyllosticta hirriensis
- Phyllosticta hispaniolae
- Phyllosticta hispida
- Phyllosticta hohenbergiae
- Phyllosticta holopteleae
- Phyllosticta holosteae
- Phyllosticta holosteicola
- Phyllosticta honbaensis
- Phyllosticta horai
- Phyllosticta hosackiae
- Phyllosticta houttuyniae
- Phyllosticta hoveniae
- Phyllosticta hoveniicola
- Phyllosticta hoyae
- Phyllosticta hranicensis
- Phyllosticta hualtatae
- Phyllosticta humeriformis
- Phyllosticta humerispora
- Phyllosticta humuli
- Phyllosticta humulina
- Phyllosticta hybridae
- Phyllosticta hydrangeae-quercifoliae
- Phyllosticta hydrastidis
- Phyllosticta hydrocotyles
- Phyllosticta hydrophila
- Phyllosticta hydrophylli
- Phyllosticta hymanaeae
- Phyllosticta hymenaeae
- Phyllosticta hymenaeicola
- Phyllosticta hymenocallidis
- Phyllosticta hymeranthi
- Phyllosticta hyoscyami
- Phyllosticta hypericicola
- Phyllosticta hypoglossi
- Phyllosticta ibarrae
- Phyllosticta ibotae
- Phyllosticta icarahyensis
- Phyllosticta ignatiana
- Phyllosticta ilicicola
- Phyllosticta ilicina
- Phyllosticta iliciperda
- Phyllosticta ilicis
- Phyllosticta iliciseda
- Phyllosticta iliensis
- Phyllosticta illinoensis
- Phyllosticta imbe
- Phyllosticta imbricatae
- Phyllosticta immersa
- Phyllosticta impatientis
- Phyllosticta implexae
- Phyllosticta incarvilleae
- Phyllosticta indianensis
- Phyllosticta indica
- Phyllosticta inermis
- Phyllosticta infuscata
- Phyllosticta ingae-dulcis
- Phyllosticta ingae-edulis
- Phyllosticta innumera
- Phyllosticta innumerabilis
- Phyllosticta insignis
- Phyllosticta insularum
- Phyllosticta interficiens
- Phyllosticta intermedia
- Phyllosticta intermixta
- Phyllosticta inulae
- Phyllosticta inulae-viscosae
- Phyllosticta inulicola
- Phyllosticta ipomoeae
- Phyllosticta ipomoeae-reptantis
- Phyllosticta iridicola
- Phyllosticta iridis
- Phyllosticta iridum
- Phyllosticta isatidis
- Phyllosticta ischnosiphonis
- Phyllosticta iserana
- Phyllosticta isolemae
- Phyllosticta isolomae
- Phyllosticta isopogonis
- Phyllosticta italica
- Phyllosticta iteae
- Phyllosticta ivaecola
- Phyllosticta ixeridis
- Phyllosticta ixiolirii
- Phyllosticta ixorae
- Phyllosticta jacobaeae
- Phyllosticta jacquemontiicola
- Phyllosticta jaffueli
- Phyllosticta jahniana
- Phyllosticta jambosae
- Phyllosticta jambosicola
- Phyllosticta japonica
- Phyllosticta jasminensis
- Phyllosticta jasmini
- Phyllosticta jasminica
- Phyllosticta jasminicola
- Phyllosticta jasminina
- Phyllosticta jasmini-pubescentis
- Phyllosticta jasminorum
- Phyllosticta jatrophae-podagricae
- Phyllosticta jordani
- Phyllosticta juglandis
- Phyllosticta julia
- Phyllosticta juliflorae
- Phyllosticta juruana
- Phyllosticta justiciicola
- Phyllosticta kalmicola
- Phyllosticta kamatii
- Phyllosticta kankeii
- Phyllosticta kanpurensis
- Phyllosticta kausarica
- Phyllosticta kawakamii
- Phyllosticta kenimaechia
- Phyllosticta kennediae
- Phyllosticta kentiae
- Phyllosticta kerguelensis
- Phyllosticta kerriae
- Phyllosticta khandalensis
- Phyllosticta kielmeyerae
- Phyllosticta kigeliae
- Phyllosticta kobayashii
- Phyllosticta kobus
- Phyllosticta koelreuteriae
- Phyllosticta kok-saghyz
- Phyllosticta koshuensis
- Phyllosticta kotoensis
- Phyllosticta kriegeriana
- Phyllosticta kumaonica
- Phyllosticta kuromoji
- Phyllosticta kurskiana
- Phyllosticta kuwacola
- Phyllosticta labiatarum
- Phyllosticta labruscae
- Phyllosticta laburni
- Phyllosticta laburnicola
- Phyllosticta lacerans
- Phyllosticta lacobaea
- Phyllosticta lactucae
- Phyllosticta lactucicola
- Phyllosticta laeliae
- Phyllosticta lafoensiae
- Phyllosticta lagascae
- Phyllosticta lagenariae
- Phyllosticta lageniformis
- Phyllosticta lagerstroemiae
- Phyllosticta lambottei
- Phyllosticta lamii
- Phyllosticta landolphiae
- Phyllosticta langarum
- Phyllosticta lantanae
- Phyllosticta lantanae-verae
- Phyllosticta lantanicola
- Phyllosticta lantanoidis
- Phyllosticta lappicola
- Phyllosticta lapsanae
- Phyllosticta laricis
- Phyllosticta larpentae
- Phyllosticta lasadjuntas
- Phyllosticta laserpitii
- Phyllosticta latemarensis
- Phyllosticta lathyricola
- Phyllosticta lathyrina
- Phyllosticta latifolia
- Phyllosticta latospora
- Phyllosticta launaeae
- Phyllosticta laurella
- Phyllosticta laureolae
- Phyllosticta lauri
- Phyllosticta laurina
- Phyllosticta laurocerasi
- Phyllosticta lavrensis
- Phyllosticta ledi
- Phyllosticta lentaginis
- Phyllosticta lenticularis
- Phyllosticta lentisci
- Phyllosticta lepidii
- Phyllosticta lepisanthicola
- Phyllosticta leptosperma
- Phyllosticta leptothyrioides
- Phyllosticta lespedezae
- Phyllosticta letendrei
- Phyllosticta leucadendri
- Phyllosticta leucanthemi
- Phyllosticta leucocarpae
- Phyllosticta leucospila
- Phyllosticta leucosticta
- Phyllosticta leucothoës
- Phyllosticta leveillei
- Phyllosticta liatridis
- Phyllosticta libanotidis
- Phyllosticta libertiae
- Phyllosticta libertiana
- Phyllosticta lichenicola
- Phyllosticta ligulariae
- Phyllosticta ligulariicola
- Phyllosticta ligustici
- Phyllosticta ligustricola
- Phyllosticta ligustrina
- Phyllosticta lilii
- Phyllosticta liliicola
- Phyllosticta limbalis
- Phyllosticta limnophila
- Phyllosticta limoni
- Phyllosticta limoniastri
- Phyllosticta linariae
- Phyllosticta linariicola
- Phyllosticta linderae
- Phyllosticta lindericola
- Phyllosticta lini
- Phyllosticta linneae
- Phyllosticta linocierae
- Phyllosticta linosyris
- Phyllosticta liquidambaricola
- Phyllosticta liquidambaris
- Phyllosticta liquidambaris-formosanae
- Phyllosticta liriodendri
- Phyllosticta liriodendrica
- Phyllosticta lisianthi
- Phyllosticta livida
- Phyllosticta llimonae
- Phyllosticta lohogadensis
- Phyllosticta lolii
- Phyllosticta londonensis
- Phyllosticta longispora
- Phyllosticta lonicerae
- Phyllosticta loranthi
- Phyllosticta lucumae
- Phyllosticta ludoviciana
- Phyllosticta ludwigiae
- Phyllosticta lueheae
- Phyllosticta lunariae
- Phyllosticta lupini
- Phyllosticta lupinicola
- Phyllosticta lupulina
- Phyllosticta lusitanica
- Phyllosticta lutetiana
- Phyllosticta lychnidina
- Phyllosticta lychnidis
- Phyllosticta lycii
- Phyllosticta lycopersici
- Phyllosticta lycopi
- Phyllosticta lycopodis
- Phyllosticta lysimachiae
- Phyllosticta lysimachiicola
- Phyllosticta lythri
- Phyllosticta macedoi
- Phyllosticta macleayae
- Phyllosticta maclurae
- Phyllosticta macrocarpa
- Phyllosticta macrochloae
- Phyllosticta macroguttata
- Phyllosticta macropycnidia
- Phyllosticta macrospora
- Phyllosticta macrothecia
- Phyllosticta macularis
- Phyllosticta maculicola
- Phyllosticta madisonensis
- Phyllosticta magellanica
- Phyllosticta magnoliae
- Phyllosticta magnoliae-lilifoliae
- Phyllosticta magnoliae-pumilae
- Phyllosticta magnusii
- Phyllosticta mahabaleshwarensis
- Phyllosticta mahaleb
- Phyllosticta mahoniae
- Phyllosticta mahoniana
- Phyllosticta mahoniicola
- Phyllosticta maianthemi
- Phyllosticta malabailae
- Phyllosticta malisorica
- Phyllosticta malkoffii
- Phyllosticta malvavisci
- Phyllosticta mammaeicola
- Phyllosticta mangiferae
- Phyllosticta mangifericola
- Phyllosticta mangrovei
- Phyllosticta manihoticola
- Phyllosticta manihotis
- Phyllosticta manioth
- Phyllosticta marantaceae
- Phyllosticta marantaceaecola
- Phyllosticta marchantiae
- Phyllosticta marginalis
- Phyllosticta maricae
- Phyllosticta markhamiae
- Phyllosticta marmorata
- Phyllosticta marrubii
- Phyllosticta marsdeniae
- Phyllosticta martialis
- Phyllosticta martyniae
- Phyllosticta masdevalliae
- Phyllosticta massalongoi
- Phyllosticta mate
- Phyllosticta mattiroloana
- Phyllosticta maurandiae
- Phyllosticta mauroceniae
- Phyllosticta mayilae
- Phyllosticta mayteni
- Phyllosticta mecranii
- Phyllosticta medeolae
- Phyllosticta medicaginis
- Phyllosticta medinillae
- Phyllosticta meibomiae
- Phyllosticta melaleuca
- Phyllosticta melampyri
- Phyllosticta melampyricola
- Phyllosticta melampyrina
- Phyllosticta melandrii
- Phyllosticta melanogena
- Phyllosticta melanoplaca
- Phyllosticta melastomacearum
- Phyllosticta melastomatis
- Phyllosticta meliae
- Phyllosticta meliloti
- Phyllosticta melissae
- Phyllosticta melissophylli
- Phyllosticta melochiae
- Phyllosticta melongenae
- Phyllosticta menispermi
- Phyllosticta menispermicola
- Phyllosticta menthae
- Phyllosticta mentzeliae
- Phyllosticta mercurialicola
- Phyllosticta mespili
- Phyllosticta mespilicola
- Phyllosticta mespilina
- Phyllosticta metaplexidis
- Phyllosticta metrosideri
- Phyllosticta micans
- Phyllosticta michailovskoensis
- Phyllosticta michauxioidis
- Phyllosticta micheliicola
- Phyllosticta micrococca
- Phyllosticta micrococcoides
- Phyllosticta microconidia
- Phyllosticta microcosi
- Phyllosticta micropuncta
- Phyllosticta microspila
- Phyllosticta microspora
- Phyllosticta microstegia
- Phyllosticta microsticta
- Phyllosticta mildae
- Phyllosticta milenae
- Phyllosticta militaris
- Phyllosticta millepunctata
- Phyllosticta millettiae
- Phyllosticta mimuli
- Phyllosticta mimusopis
- Phyllosticta mimusopis-elengi
- Phyllosticta mimusopsidis
- Phyllosticta minima
- Phyllosticta minor
- Phyllosticta minussinensis
- Phyllosticta minuta
- Phyllosticta minutaspora
- Phyllosticta minutella
- Phyllosticta minutissima
- Phyllosticta mirabilis
- Phyllosticta mirbelii
- Phyllosticta missionum
- Phyllosticta mitellae
- Phyllosticta miurae
- Phyllosticta miyakei
- Phyllosticta molleriana
- Phyllosticta molluginis
- Phyllosticta molungu
- Phyllosticta momisiana
- Phyllosticta momordicae
- Phyllosticta monardae
- Phyllosticta monardellae
- Phyllosticta monardicola
- Phyllosticta monetiae
- Phyllosticta monogyna
- Phyllosticta monspessulani
- Phyllosticta monsterae
- Phyllosticta montana
- Phyllosticta montellica
- Phyllosticta montemartinii
- Phyllosticta montteae
- Phyllosticta moquileae
- Phyllosticta moquilearum
- Phyllosticta moquiniae
- Phyllosticta moravica
- Phyllosticta mori-albae
- Phyllosticta moricola
- Phyllosticta morifolia
- Phyllosticta moringicola
- Phyllosticta morrisianae
- Phyllosticta mortolensis
- Phyllosticta mortoni
- Phyllosticta mortonii
- Phyllosticta moscosoi
- Phyllosticta moutan
- Phyllosticta mucunae
- Phyllosticta muehlenbeckiae
- Phyllosticta muehlenbeckiana
- Phyllosticta mulgedii
- Phyllosticta multicorniculata
- Phyllosticta multiformis
- Phyllosticta multimaculans
- Phyllosticta murnadensis
- Phyllosticta murrayae
- Phyllosticta murrayicola
- Phyllosticta musae
- Phyllosticta musae-sapientium
- Phyllosticta muscadinii
- Phyllosticta muscari
- Phyllosticta musicola
- Phyllosticta mussaendae
- Phyllosticta myosotidicola
- Phyllosticta myricae
- Phyllosticta myroxyli
- Phyllosticta myrticola
- Phyllosticta nandinae
- Phyllosticta napoleoneae
- Phyllosticta narcissicola
- Phyllosticta nasturtii
- Phyllosticta naumovii
- Phyllosticta nebulosa
- Phyllosticta necatrix
- Phyllosticta neeae
- Phyllosticta neglecta
- Phyllosticta negundicola
- Phyllosticta negundinis
- Phyllosticta nelumbonis
- Phyllosticta nemophilae
- Phyllosticta nemoralis
- Phyllosticta neomexicana
- Phyllosticta nepenthacearum
- Phyllosticta nepetae
- Phyllosticta nepeticola
- Phyllosticta nephelii
- Phyllosticta nerii
- Phyllosticta nerii-atropurpurii
- Phyllosticta neriicola
- Phyllosticta nerii-oleandri
- Phyllosticta nervisequa
- Phyllosticta nesaeae
- Phyllosticta neurospilea
- Phyllosticta neuroterigallicola
- Phyllosticta nicandrae
- Phyllosticta nicandricola
- Phyllosticta nicolai
- Phyllosticta nicotianae
- Phyllosticta nicotianicola
- Phyllosticta nieliana
- Phyllosticta nigra
- Phyllosticta nigrescens
- Phyllosticta nigromaculans
- Phyllosticta nitida
- Phyllosticta nitidula
- Phyllosticta nivea
- Phyllosticta nobilis
- Phyllosticta novissima
- Phyllosticta nubecula
- Phyllosticta nucularia
- Phyllosticta numerospora
- Phyllosticta nupharis
- Phyllosticta nuptialis
- Phyllosticta nuttaliae
- Phyllosticta nyctanthis
- Phyllosticta nymphaeacea
- Phyllosticta nymphaeicola
- Phyllosticta nyssae
- Phyllosticta oahuensis
- Phyllosticta oakesiae
- Phyllosticta obliqua
- Phyllosticta obstrudens
- Phyllosticta occulta
- Phyllosticta ocellata
- Phyllosticta ocimicola
- Phyllosticta oculata
- Phyllosticta odinae
- Phyllosticta odontoglossi
- Phyllosticta oleae
- Phyllosticta oleandri
- Phyllosticta oleina
- Phyllosticta olympica
- Phyllosticta omphaleae
- Phyllosticta oncidii-sphacelati
- Phyllosticta onobrychidis
- Phyllosticta ononidis
- Phyllosticta onosmae
- Phyllosticta opaca
- Phyllosticta opulasteris
- Phyllosticta opuli
- Phyllosticta opuntiae
- Phyllosticta opuntiae-parahybensis
- Phyllosticta opuntiicola
- Phyllosticta orbicula
- Phyllosticta orbicularis
- Phyllosticta oreodaphnes
- Phyllosticta origani
- Phyllosticta ormocarpi
- Phyllosticta orni
- Phyllosticta orobella
- Phyllosticta orobina
- Phyllosticta orontii
- Phyllosticta oroxyli
- Phyllosticta oryzae
- Phyllosticta oryzicola
- Phyllosticta oryzina
- Phyllosticta osmanthi
- Phyllosticta osmanthicola
- Phyllosticta osteospora
- Phyllosticta ostryae
- Phyllosticta otites
- Phyllosticta oudemansii
- Phyllosticta ovalifolii
- Phyllosticta owaniana
- Phyllosticta owariensis
- Phyllosticta owensii
- Phyllosticta oxalidicola
- Phyllosticta oxalidis
- Phyllosticta oxycocci
- Phyllosticta oxydendri
- Phyllosticta oxytropis
- Phyllosticta pachysandrae
- Phyllosticta pachystimae
- Phyllosticta padi
- Phyllosticta paederiae
- Phyllosticta paeoniae
- Phyllosticta palaquii
- Phyllosticta paleicola
- Phyllosticta paliuri
- Phyllosticta pallens
- Phyllosticta pallida
- Phyllosticta pallidior
- Phyllosticta pallidocarpa
- Phyllosticta pallor
- Phyllosticta palmarum
- Phyllosticta palmetto
- Phyllosticta palmicola
- Phyllosticta palustris
- Phyllosticta panacis
- Phyllosticta pandanicola
- Phyllosticta panici
- Phyllosticta panici-maximi
- Phyllosticta panici-miliacei
- Phyllosticta papaveris
- Phyllosticta papayae
- Phyllosticta papayicola
- Phyllosticta papayina
- Phyllosticta papuensis
- Phyllosticta paraensis
- Phyllosticta paranaensis
- Phyllosticta paraopebensis
- Phyllosticta parasitica
- Phyllosticta paratropiae
- Phyllosticta parkinsoniae
- Phyllosticta parvimammata
- Phyllosticta passerinii
- Phyllosticta passiflorae
- Phyllosticta passifloramaculans
- Phyllosticta patagonulae
- Phyllosticta patouillardii
- Phyllosticta patriniae-villosae
- Phyllosticta pauciseptata
- Phyllosticta paulensis
- Phyllosticta paulowniae
- Phyllosticta paupercula
- Phyllosticta paviaecola
- Phyllosticta pedicularis
- Phyllosticta pelargonii
- Phyllosticta pellucida
- Phyllosticta penicillariae
- Phyllosticta pennsylvanica
- Phyllosticta penstemonicola
- Phyllosticta pentadis-carneae
- Phyllosticta pentastemonis
- Phyllosticta pentatis
- Phyllosticta pentopetiae
- Phyllosticta pentstemonis
- Phyllosticta perforans
- Phyllosticta periplocae
- Phyllosticta perniciosa
- Phyllosticta perowskiae
- Phyllosticta perpusilla
- Phyllosticta perseae
- Phyllosticta persearum
- Phyllosticta persicae
- Phyllosticta persicicola
- Phyllosticta persicophila
- Phyllosticta personatae
- Phyllosticta pertundens
- Phyllosticta pertyae-rigidulae
- Phyllosticta pervincae
- Phyllosticta petasitidis
- Phyllosticta petiveriae
- Phyllosticta petrakii
- Phyllosticta petroselini
- Phyllosticta petuniae
- Phyllosticta peucedani
- Phyllosticta pfaffii
- Phyllosticta phacidioides
- Phyllosticta phaea
- Phyllosticta phaeospora
- Phyllosticta phalenopsidis
- Phyllosticta phanerura
- Phyllosticta pharbitis
- Phyllosticta phari
- Phyllosticta phaseoli-lunati
- Phyllosticta phaseolina
- Phyllosticta phellodendri
- Phyllosticta phellodendricola
- Phyllosticta phialodisci
- Phyllosticta phillyreae
- Phyllosticta phillyricola
- Phyllosticta phillyrina
- Phyllosticta philodendri
- Phyllosticta philodendricola
- Phyllosticta philodendrina
- Phyllosticta phlei
- Phyllosticta phleicola
- Phyllosticta phlogis
- Phyllosticta phlomidis
- Phyllosticta phomiformis
- Phyllosticta phoradendri
- Phyllosticta phormigena
- Phyllosticta phormiigena
- Phyllosticta photiniae
- Phyllosticta photinica
- Phyllosticta photiniicola
- Phyllosticta phragmitis
- Phyllosticta phrymae
- Phyllosticta phyllachoroides
- Phyllosticta phyllodendri
- Phyllosticta phyllodiorum
- Phyllosticta phyllostachydis
- Phyllosticta physaleos
- Phyllosticta physciicola
- Phyllosticta physocarpi
- Phyllosticta phyteumatis
- Phyllosticta phytolaccae
- Phyllosticta phytolaccicola
- Phyllosticta phytoptorum
- Phyllosticta picroxylina
- Phyllosticta pilispora
- Phyllosticta pilocarpi
- Phyllosticta pilocarpicola
- Phyllosticta pimpinellae
- Phyllosticta pipericola
- Phyllosticta piperis
- Phyllosticta piperis-betae
- Phyllosticta piperis-betle
- Phyllosticta piperis-nigri
- Phyllosticta piriseda
- Phyllosticta pisi
- Phyllosticta pitcheriana
- Phyllosticta pithecellobii
- Phyllosticta pithecellobii-monensis
- Phyllosticta pittospori
- Phyllosticta pittosporina
- Phyllosticta pivensis
- Phyllosticta plantaginella
- Phyllosticta plantaginicola
- Phyllosticta plantaginis
- Phyllosticta plantanoidis
- Phyllosticta platani
- Phyllosticta platani-acerifoliae
- Phyllosticta platanoides
- Phyllosticta platycerii
- Phyllosticta platycodonis
- Phyllosticta platylobii
- Phyllosticta plectranthi
- Phyllosticta pleopeltidis
- Phyllosticta pleromatis
- Phyllosticta pleurospermi
- Phyllosticta pleurothallidis
- Phyllosticta plumbaginicola
- Phyllosticta plumbaginis
- Phyllosticta plumeriae
- Phyllosticta plumierae
- Phyllosticta plurivora
- Phyllosticta podagrariae
- Phyllosticta podocarpi
- Phyllosticta podophylli
- Phyllosticta podophyllina
- Phyllosticta pogostemonis
- Phyllosticta polemonii
- Phyllosticta pollaccii
- Phyllosticta polyalthiicola
- Phyllosticta polyanthes
- Phyllosticta polyanthis
- Phyllosticta polygalae
- Phyllosticta polygonati
- Phyllosticta polygonati-officinalis
- Phyllosticta polygoni
- Phyllosticta polygoni-avicularis
- Phyllosticta polygoni-bungeani
- Phyllosticta polygonorum
- Phyllosticta polypodii-australis
- Phyllosticta polypodiorum
- Phyllosticta polypsecadiospora
- Phyllosticta polysciadis
- Phyllosticta pongamiae
- Phyllosticta pontederiae
- Phyllosticta populea
- Phyllosticta populina
- Phyllosticta populi-nigrae
- Phyllosticta populnea
- Phyllosticta populorum
- Phyllosticta porteana
- Phyllosticta porteri
- Phyllosticta portoricensis
- Phyllosticta portulacae
- Phyllosticta potamogetonis
- Phyllosticta potentillica
- Phyllosticta poterii
- Phyllosticta pothicola
- Phyllosticta pothina
- Phyllosticta praetervisa
- Phyllosticta prangicola
- Phyllosticta pratima
- Phyllosticta prenanthis
- Phyllosticta primulicola
- Phyllosticta prini
- Phyllosticta profusa
- Phyllosticta prominens
- Phyllosticta propinqua
- Phyllosticta prosopidicola
- Phyllosticta prosopidis
- Phyllosticta prostantherae
- Phyllosticta prostrata
- Phyllosticta protiicola
- Phyllosticta proustiae
- Phyllosticta prousticola
- Phyllosticta pruni-avium
- Phyllosticta prunicola
- Phyllosticta pruni-domesticae
- Phyllosticta prunigena
- Phyllosticta pruni-mahaleb
- Phyllosticta pruni-nanae
- Phyllosticta pruni-salicinae
- Phyllosticta pruni-spinosae
- Phyllosticta pruni-virginianae
- Phyllosticta pseudacaciae
- Phyllosticta pseudacori
- Phyllosticta pseudocapsici
- Phyllosticta pseudoplatani
- Phyllosticta pseudotsugae
- Phyllosticta psidiella
- Phyllosticta psidii
- Phyllosticta psidiicola
- Phyllosticta psoraleae
- Phyllosticta psychotriae
- Phyllosticta pteleae
- Phyllosticta pteleicola
- Phyllosticta pterandrae
- Phyllosticta pteridina
- Phyllosticta pteridis
- Phyllosticta pterocarpi
- Phyllosticta pterocaryae
- Phyllosticta pucciniophila
- Phyllosticta pucciniospila
- Phyllosticta puerariae
- Phyllosticta puerariicola
- Phyllosticta pulmonariae
- Phyllosticta pumila
- Phyllosticta punctata
- Phyllosticta punctiformis
- Phyllosticta punica
- Phyllosticta purpurea
- Phyllosticta pustulosa
- Phyllosticta putranjivae
- Phyllosticta putrefaciens
- Phyllosticta pygmaea
- Phyllosticta pyricola
- Phyllosticta pyrina
- Phyllosticta pyrolae
- Phyllosticta pyrorum
- Phyllosticta qualeae
- Phyllosticta quamoclit
- Phyllosticta quercicola
- Phyllosticta quercus
- Phyllosticta quercus-cocciferae
- Phyllosticta quercus-ilicis
- Phyllosticta quercus-prini
- Phyllosticta quercus-rubrae
- Phyllosticta quernea
- Phyllosticta quinquefoliae
- Phyllosticta radiata
- Phyllosticta rafinesquii
- Phyllosticta ragatensis
- Phyllosticta ragnhildae
- Phyllosticta raimundi
- Phyllosticta ralfsii
- Phyllosticta ramicola
- Phyllosticta ranunculi
- Phyllosticta ranunculicola
- Phyllosticta ranunculorum
- Phyllosticta raoi
- Phyllosticta rapaneae
- Phyllosticta raphani
- Phyllosticta raphiolepicola
- Phyllosticta raui
- Phyllosticta ravenalae
- Phyllosticta regis
- Phyllosticta rehmii
- Phyllosticta religiosa
- Phyllosticta renantherae
- Phyllosticta renouana
- Phyllosticta resedae
- Phyllosticta reyesii
- Phyllosticta reynoutriae
- Phyllosticta rhamni
- Phyllosticta rhamnicola
- Phyllosticta rhamnigena
- Phyllosticta rhaphiolepicola
- Phyllosticta rhaphithamni
- Phyllosticta rhapidis
- Phyllosticta rhapiolepidis
- Phyllosticta rhea
- Phyllosticta rhei
- Phyllosticta rheina
- Phyllosticta rhexiae
- Phyllosticta rhipsalidicola
- Phyllosticta rhododendricola
- Phyllosticta rhododendri-flavi
- Phyllosticta rhodomyrti
- Phyllosticta rhodorae
- Phyllosticta rhodotypi
- Phyllosticta rhoicola
- Phyllosticta rhoina
- Phyllosticta rhois
- Phyllosticta rhoiseda
- Phyllosticta rhynchosiae
- Phyllosticta ribesicida
- Phyllosticta ribis
- Phyllosticta ribis-aurei
- Phyllosticta ribiseda
- Phyllosticta ribis-rubri
- Phyllosticta richardiae
- Phyllosticta richardsoniae
- Phyllosticta ricini
- Phyllosticta rimosa
- Phyllosticta rivinae
- Phyllosticta robergei
- Phyllosticta roberti
- Phyllosticta robertii
- Phyllosticta robiniae
- Phyllosticta robinicola
- Phyllosticta robiniella
- Phyllosticta roboris
- Phyllosticta roglerii
- Phyllosticta romana
- Phyllosticta romuleae
- Phyllosticta rondeletiae
- Phyllosticta rosae
- Phyllosticta rosae-setigerae
- Phyllosticta rosae-sinensis
- Phyllosticta rosicola
- Phyllosticta rostkoviae
- Phyllosticta rotaliae
- Phyllosticta rottlerae
- Phyllosticta roumeguerei
- Phyllosticta rubi
- Phyllosticta rubi-adenotrichopodi
- Phyllosticta rubiae
- Phyllosticta rubicola
- Phyllosticta rubi-odorati
- Phyllosticta ruborum
- Phyllosticta rubra
- Phyllosticta rudbeckiae
- Phyllosticta rugelii
- Phyllosticta rumicicola
- Phyllosticta rumicis
- Phyllosticta ruscicola
- Phyllosticta ruscigena
- Phyllosticta rutaceae
- Phyllosticta sabalicola
- Phyllosticta saccardoi
- Phyllosticta sacchari-major
- Phyllosticta saccharina
- Phyllosticta sagittariae
- Phyllosticta sagittifoliae
- Phyllosticta salicicola
- Phyllosticta salicifolia
- Phyllosticta salicina
- Phyllosticta salicis
- Phyllosticta salisburiae
- Phyllosticta salisburyae
- Phyllosticta salviae
- Phyllosticta sambac
- Phyllosticta sambucicola
- Phyllosticta sambucina
- Phyllosticta sampaioana
- Phyllosticta sancti-iosephi
- Phyllosticta sanderi
- Phyllosticta sanguinariae
- Phyllosticta sanguinea
- Phyllosticta sanguisorbae
- Phyllosticta saniculae
- Phyllosticta sansevieriae
- Phyllosticta santaguina
- Phyllosticta sapindi
- Phyllosticta sapindicola
- Phyllosticta sapindi-emarginati
- Phyllosticta sapindina
- Phyllosticta sapotae
- Phyllosticta sapotarum
- Phyllosticta sapoticola
- Phyllosticta sarcomphali
- Phyllosticta sarcomphila
- Phyllosticta sardoa
- Phyllosticta sarraceniae
- Phyllosticta sassafras
- Phyllosticta saussureae
- Phyllosticta saxifragae
- Phyllosticta saxifragae-cordifoliae
- Phyllosticta saxifragarum
- Phyllosticta saxifragicola
- Phyllosticta scabiosa
- Phyllosticta scabiosae
- Phyllosticta scaevolae
- Phyllosticta scariolicola
- Phyllosticta schaefferiae
- Phyllosticta schini
- Phyllosticta schizandrae
- Phyllosticta sciadophila
- Phyllosticta sciadophylli
- Phyllosticta scirpi
- Phyllosticta scirpicola
- Phyllosticta sclerolobii
- Phyllosticta scleropoae
- Phyllosticta sclerotialis
- Phyllosticta scolymi
- Phyllosticta scorodoniae
- Phyllosticta scorzonerae
- Phyllosticta scrophulariae
- Phyllosticta scrophulariae-bosniacae
- Phyllosticta scrophulariicola
- Phyllosticta scrophularinea
- Phyllosticta scutellariae
- Phyllosticta scutiae
- Phyllosticta sechii
- Phyllosticta securinegae
- Phyllosticta sedgwickii
- Phyllosticta sedi
- Phyllosticta selini
- Phyllosticta sellowiana
- Phyllosticta semeles
- Phyllosticta senecionicola
- Phyllosticta senecionis-cordati
- Phyllosticta senecionis-nemorensis
- Phyllosticta sepium
- Phyllosticta sequoiae
- Phyllosticta sequoiicola
- Phyllosticta serebrianikowii
- Phyllosticta serjaniae
- Phyllosticta serjaniarum
- Phyllosticta serjaniicola
- Phyllosticta serotina
- Phyllosticta serratulae
- Phyllosticta sesami
- Phyllosticta sesbaniae
- Phyllosticta setariae
- Phyllosticta shiraiana
- Phyllosticta siameae
- Phyllosticta siccata
- Phyllosticta sicyna
- Phyllosticta sidaecola
- Phyllosticta siemaszkoi
- Phyllosticta silenes
- Phyllosticta siliquastri
- Phyllosticta silveirae
- Phyllosticta similis
- Phyllosticta sinapis
- Phyllosticta sinuosa
- Phyllosticta siphocampyli
- Phyllosticta siphonis
- Phyllosticta siphonodontis
- Phyllosticta sisalanae
- Phyllosticta sissoo
- Phyllosticta sissooicola
- Phyllosticta sisymbrii
- Phyllosticta skimmiae
- Phyllosticta smilacigena
- Phyllosticta smilacina
- Phyllosticta smilacinae
- Phyllosticta smilacinae-trifoliae
- Phyllosticta smilacis
- Phyllosticta socia
- Phyllosticta sojaecola
- Phyllosticta solani
- Phyllosticta solani-pseudocapsici
- Phyllosticta solidaginicola
- Phyllosticta solidaginis
- Phyllosticta solidaginis-serotinae
- Phyllosticta solitaria
- Phyllosticta sonchi
- Phyllosticta sophorae
- Phyllosticta sophoricola
- Phyllosticta sorbariae
- Phyllosticta sorbi
- Phyllosticta sordida
- Phyllosticta sordidissima
- Phyllosticta sordidula
- Phyllosticta sorghi
- Phyllosticta sorghiphila
- Phyllosticta soriformis
- Phyllosticta spaethiana
- Phyllosticta sparsa
- Phyllosticta spartinae
- Phyllosticta spermoidea
- Phyllosticta spermoides
- Phyllosticta speschnewiana
- Phyllosticta sphaeropsispora
- Phyllosticta sphingina
- Phyllosticta spigeliae
- Phyllosticta spinarum
- Phyllosticta spinosae
- Phyllosticta spiraeae-salicifoliae
- Phyllosticta spiraeina
- Phyllosticta splachni
- Phyllosticta sporalonga
- Phyllosticta stachydis
- Phyllosticta stachyopsidis
- Phyllosticta stangeriae
- Phyllosticta stanhopeae
- Phyllosticta staphyleae
- Phyllosticta staphyleicola
- Phyllosticta starbaeckii
- Phyllosticta statices
- Phyllosticta statices-gmelinii
- Phyllosticta stauntoniae
- Phyllosticta steironematis
- Phyllosticta stenocarpi
- Phyllosticta stenospora
- Phyllosticta stenotaphri
- Phyllosticta stenotaphricola
- Phyllosticta stephaniae
- Phyllosticta stephanoti
- Phyllosticta stephanotidis
- Phyllosticta sterculiae
- Phyllosticta sterculiae-frondosae
- Phyllosticta sterculiae-nobilis
- Phyllosticta sterculiicola
- Phyllosticta stettiniana
- Phyllosticta stevenii
- Phyllosticta stevensii
- Phyllosticta stewartiae
- Phyllosticta stigmatophylli
- Phyllosticta stillingiae
- Phyllosticta stokesiae
- Phyllosticta straminella
- Phyllosticta stratiotis
- Phyllosticta strelitziaecola
- Phyllosticta striolata
- Phyllosticta strychni
- Phyllosticta stuckertii
- Phyllosticta stygia
- Phyllosticta styracina
- Phyllosticta subeffusa
- Phyllosticta subtilis
- Phyllosticta succedanea
- Phyllosticta succinosa
- Phyllosticta succisae
- Phyllosticta succisicola
- Phyllosticta suecica
- Phyllosticta suedae
- Phyllosticta sulata
- Phyllosticta sultanii
- Phyllosticta sumbaviae
- Phyllosticta superficialis
- Phyllosticta superflua
- Phyllosticta supervacanea
- Phyllosticta swartziae
- Phyllosticta swieteniae
- Phyllosticta sycina
- Phyllosticta sycophila
- Phyllosticta sydowiana
- Phyllosticta sydowii
- Phyllosticta symphoriella
- Phyllosticta symphyti
- Phyllosticta symploci
- Phyllosticta syriaca
- Phyllosticta syringae
- Phyllosticta syringella
- Phyllosticta syringicola
- Phyllosticta syringophila
- Phyllosticta syzygii
- Phyllosticta tabebuiae
- Phyllosticta tabernaemontanae
- Phyllosticta tagana
- Phyllosticta tagetis
- Phyllosticta tahirica
- Phyllosticta take
- Phyllosticta talae
- Phyllosticta talisiae
- Phyllosticta talisiae-major
- Phyllosticta tamarindicola
- Phyllosticta tamarindina
- Phyllosticta tambowiensis
- Phyllosticta tami
- Phyllosticta tamicola
- Phyllosticta tanaceti
- Phyllosticta taraxaci
- Phyllosticta tassiana
- Phyllosticta tassii
- Phyllosticta tatarici
- Phyllosticta taurica
- Phyllosticta tau-saghyzi
- Phyllosticta tau-saghyzianum
- Phyllosticta taxi
- Phyllosticta tayuvae
- Phyllosticta tecomae
- Phyllosticta tectonae
- Phyllosticta telekiae
- Phyllosticta tellimae
- Phyllosticta telopeae
- Phyllosticta tenebrosa
- Phyllosticta tenerrima
- Phyllosticta tenuipes
- Phyllosticta tephrosiae
- Phyllosticta terebinthi
- Phyllosticta terminaliae
- Phyllosticta terminalis
- Phyllosticta teshimganica
- Phyllosticta tetonensis
- Phyllosticta tetraplodontis
- Phyllosticta tetrastigmatis
- Phyllosticta teucrii
- Phyllosticta texensis
- Phyllosticta thalictri
- Phyllosticta thallina
- Phyllosticta theacearum
- Phyllosticta theae
- Phyllosticta theicola
- Phyllosticta theobromae
- Phyllosticta theobromicola
- Phyllosticta thermopsidis
- Phyllosticta thibaudiae
- Phyllosticta thladianthae
- Phyllosticta thuemenii
- Phyllosticta thujae
- Phyllosticta thujana
- Phyllosticta thujopsidis
- Phyllosticta thunbergii
- Phyllosticta thuringiaca
- Phyllosticta thymi
- Phyllosticta tiliae
- Phyllosticta tiliicola
- Phyllosticta tillandsiae
- Phyllosticta tinctoriae
- Phyllosticta tinea
- Phyllosticta tineola
- Phyllosticta tini
- Phyllosticta tinosporae
- Phyllosticta tinosporicola
- Phyllosticta tipuanae
- Phyllosticta tirolensis
- Phyllosticta tobira
- Phyllosticta tokutaroi
- Phyllosticta tonduzii
- Phyllosticta torilidis
- Phyllosticta tormentillae
- Phyllosticta tortilicaudata
- Phyllosticta toxica
- Phyllosticta toxicodendri
- Phyllosticta trachelospermi
- Phyllosticta tragii
- Phyllosticta trailii
- Phyllosticta transiens
- Phyllosticta translucens
- Phyllosticta trapezuntica
- Phyllosticta trappenii
- Phyllosticta trautmanniana
- Phyllosticta treleasei
- Phyllosticta trematis
- Phyllosticta tremniacensis
- Phyllosticta triacanthi
- Phyllosticta tricalysiae
- Phyllosticta trichostomi
- Phyllosticta tricuspidatae
- Phyllosticta tricyclae
- Phyllosticta trifolii
- Phyllosticta trifolii-minoris
- Phyllosticta trifolii-montani
- Phyllosticta trifoliiseda
- Phyllosticta trifoliorum
- Phyllosticta trigoniae
- Phyllosticta trillii
- Phyllosticta trilliicola
- Phyllosticta trilobachnes
- Phyllosticta tristaniae
- Phyllosticta trochodendri
- Phyllosticta trochodendricola
- Phyllosticta trollii
- Phyllosticta trolliicola
- Phyllosticta tropaeoli
- Phyllosticta tuberosa
- Phyllosticta tuisiensis
- Phyllosticta tulipiferae
- Phyllosticta tumanensis
- Phyllosticta tumoricola
- Phyllosticta turangae
- Phyllosticta turconii
- Phyllosticta turmalis
- Phyllosticta turritis
- Phyllosticta tussilaginis
- Phyllosticta tuzsonii
- Phyllosticta tweediana
- Phyllosticta typhae
- Phyllosticta typhina
- Phyllosticta ulcinjensis
- Phyllosticta uleana
- Phyllosticta ulmaria
- Phyllosticta ulmariae
- Phyllosticta ulmi
- Phyllosticta ulmi-rubrae
- Phyllosticta umbellatarum
- Phyllosticta umbilici
- Phyllosticta umbrinofumosa
- Phyllosticta ungerniae
- Phyllosticta ungnadiae
- Phyllosticta urenae
- Phyllosticta urticae
- Phyllosticta urticae-piluliferae
- Phyllosticta urticina
- Phyllosticta usteri
- Phyllosticta usteriana
- Phyllosticta uvariae
- Phyllosticta uvulariae
- Phyllosticta uzbekistanica
- Phyllosticta vaccariae
- Phyllosticta vaccinii
- Phyllosticta vaccinii-arctostaphyli
- Phyllosticta vaccinii-hirti
- Phyllosticta vaga
- Phyllosticta vagans
- Phyllosticta valerandi
- Phyllosticta valerianae
- Phyllosticta valerianae-tripteris
- Phyllosticta valerianellae
- Phyllosticta vallisneriae
- Phyllosticta valparadisiaca
- Phyllosticta vandae
- Phyllosticta vandermeii
- Phyllosticta vangueriae
- Phyllosticta vanillae
- Phyllosticta variabilis
- Phyllosticta variegata
- Phyllosticta variicolor
- Phyllosticta vasicae
- Phyllosticta velata
- Phyllosticta venziana
- Phyllosticta veraltiana
- Phyllosticta veratri
- Phyllosticta verbasci
- Phyllosticta verbenae
- Phyllosticta verbenicola
- Phyllosticta verbesinae
- Phyllosticta vernonicida
- Phyllosticta vernonicola
- Phyllosticta veronicae
- Phyllosticta vesicatoria
- Phyllosticta vexans
- Phyllosticta viburni
- Phyllosticta viburnicola
- Phyllosticta viburni-opuli
- Phyllosticta vignae
- Phyllosticta villaresiae
- Phyllosticta villosa
- Phyllosticta vincae
- Phyllosticta vincae-majoris
- Phyllosticta vincae-minoris
- Phyllosticta vincetoxici
- Phyllosticta vincicola
- Phyllosticta vindobonensis
- Phyllosticta viniferae
- Phyllosticta violae
- Phyllosticta violae-caninae
- Phyllosticta violaecola
- Phyllosticta virentis
- Phyllosticta virginiana
- Phyllosticta virginica
- Phyllosticta viridis
- Phyllosticta viriditingens
- Phyllosticta vismiae
- Phyllosticta vitea
- Phyllosticta viticola
- Phyllosticta vitis
- Phyllosticta vittata
- Phyllosticta vitum
- Phyllosticta voandeziae
- Phyllosticta voandzeiae
- Phyllosticta vogelii
- Phyllosticta vogelis
- Phyllosticta volkartii
- Phyllosticta volubilis
- Phyllosticta vossii
- Phyllosticta vulgaris
- Phyllosticta vulpinae
- Phyllosticta walleniae
- Phyllosticta waracola
- Phyllosticta weigelae
- Phyllosticta weigeliana
- Phyllosticta werestahagini
- Phyllosticta werestshagini
- Phyllosticta westendorpii
- Phyllosticta wigandiae
- Phyllosticta wikstroemiae
- Phyllosticta winteri
- Phyllosticta wisconsinensis
- Phyllosticta wislizeni
- Phyllosticta wistariae
- Phyllosticta wistariicola
- Phyllosticta woronowii
- Phyllosticta wrightiae
- Phyllosticta wulfeniae
- Phyllosticta wyomingensis
- Phyllosticta xanthorrhizae
- Phyllosticta xanthosomatis
- Phyllosticta xeromphiicola
- Phyllosticta xerotis
- Phyllosticta xylopiae
- Phyllosticta xylopiae-sericeae
- Phyllosticta yaguarum
- Phyllosticta yamaguchii
- Phyllosticta yanagawana
- Phyllosticta yerbae
- Phyllosticta yersini
- Phyllosticta yuccae
- Phyllosticta yuccigena
- Phyllosticta yugokwa
- Phyllosticta yulan
- Phyllosticta yunaensis
- Phyllosticta zahlbruckneri
- Phyllosticta zambiensis
- Phyllosticta zanthoxyli
- Phyllosticta zeae
- Phyllosticta zeae-maydis
- Phyllosticta zeina
- Phyllosticta zimmermannii
- Phyllosticta zingiberis
- Phyllosticta zinniae
- Phyllosticta zinniae-lenearis
- Phyllosticta ziziphi
- Phyllosticta ziziphorae
- Phyllosticta zonata
