= Phyllosticta caricae-papayae =

Scientific classification
- Kingdom: Fungi
- Division: Ascomycota
- Class: Dothideomycetes
- Order: Botryosphaeriales
- Family: Botryosphaeriaceae
- Genus: Phyllosticta
- Species: P. caricae-papayae

Binomial name
- Phyllosticta caricae-papayae Allesch. (1895)

Species of fungus

Phyllosticta caricae-papayae is a fungal plant pathogen infecting papayas.
