= List of foliage plant diseases (Araliaceae) =

This is a list of diseases of foliage plants belonging to the family Araliaceae that occur in the United States.

== Plant species ==
Plant species
Code	Scientifice Name	Common Name
B	Brassaia actinophylla	umbrella tree
D	Dizygotheca spp.	false Aralia
Fl	× Fatshedera lizei	
Fj	Fatsia japonica	
H	Hedera helix	English ivy
P	Polyscias spp.	Aralia
S	Heptapleurum arboricola	dwarf schefflera

== Bacterial diseases ==
Bacterial diseases
Common name	Scientific name	Plants affected
Bacterial leaf spots	Erwinia chrysanthemi	B, S
Bacterial leaf spots	Pseudomonas cichorii	B, Fl, Fj, P, S
Bacterial leaf spots	Xanthomonas campestris pv. hederae	B, Fl, Fj, H, P, S

== Fungal diseases ==
Fungal diseases
Common name	Scientific name	Plants affected
Alternaria leaf spot	Alternaria panax	B, D, Fl, P, S
Anthracnose	Colletotrichum trichellum	H
Cercospora leaf spot	Cercospora spp.	B, S
Damping-off	Pythium spp.	B, Fj, S
Gray mold	Botrytis cinerea	H
Phyllosticta leaf spot	Phyllosticta concentrica Discochora philoprina [teleomorph]	H
Phytophthora leaf spot	Phytophthora palmivora	H
Phytophthora leaf spot	Phytophthora nicotianae var. parasitica = Phytophthora parasitica =Phytophthora nicotianae	B
Phytophthora root rot	Phytophthora spp.	H
Pythium root rot	Pythium spp.	B
Rhizoctonia aerial blight and stem rot	Rhizoctonia solani	all
Southern blight	Sclerotium rolfsii	all
