= Phyllosticta penicillariae =

Scientific classification
- Kingdom: Fungi
- Division: Ascomycota
- Class: Dothideomycetes
- Order: Botryosphaeriales
- Family: Botryosphaeriaceae
- Genus: Phyllosticta
- Species: P. penicillariae

Binomial name
- Phyllosticta penicillariae Speg. (1914)

Species of fungus

Phyllosticta penicillariae is a fungal plant pathogen infecting pearl millet.
