= Phyllosticta manihotis =

Scientific classification
- Kingdom: Fungi
- Division: Ascomycota
- Class: Dothideomycetes
- Order: Botryosphaeriales
- Family: Botryosphaeriaceae
- Genus: Phyllosticta
- Species: P. manihotis

Binomial name
- Phyllosticta manihotis Viégas [as 'manihotae'], (1944)

Species of fungus

Phyllosticta manihotis is a plant pathogen originating from the Philippines that forms on the leaves of several cassava species like Manihot dichotoma, M. glaziovii and M. heterophylla.
