= Phyllosticta platani =

Scientific classification
- Kingdom: Fungi
- Division: Ascomycota
- Class: Dothideomycetes
- Order: Botryosphaeriales
- Family: Botryosphaeriaceae
- Genus: Phyllosticta
- Species: P. platani

Binomial name
- Phyllosticta platani Sacc. & Speg.,(1878)

Species of fungus

Phyllosticta platani is a fungal plant pathogen infecting plane trees. It is found in Eastern North America and Europe.
