= Phyllosticta cyclaminella =

Scientific classification
- Kingdom: Fungi
- Division: Ascomycota
- Class: Dothideomycetes
- Order: Botryosphaeriales
- Family: Botryosphaeriaceae
- Genus: Phyllosticta
- Species: P. cyclaminella

Binomial name
- Phyllosticta cyclaminella Bubák

Species of fungus

Phyllosticta cyclaminella is a fungal plant pathogen that infects cyclamens.
