= Phyllosticta micropuncta =

Scientific classification
- Kingdom: Fungi
- Division: Ascomycota
- Class: Dothideomycetes
- Order: Botryosphaeriales
- Family: Botryosphaeriaceae
- Genus: Phyllosticta
- Species: P. micropuncta

Binomial name
- Phyllosticta micropuncta Cooke

Species of fungus

Phyllosticta micropuncta is a plant pathogen of the Botryosphaeriaceae family of sac fungi infecting avocados.
