= Phyllosticta palmetto =

Scientific classification
- Kingdom: Fungi
- Division: Ascomycota
- Class: Dothideomycetes
- Order: Botryosphaeriales
- Family: Botryosphaeriaceae
- Genus: Phyllosticta
- Species: P. palmetto

Binomial name
- Phyllosticta palmetto Ellis & Everh.

Species of fungus

Phyllosticta palmetto is a fungal plant pathogen infecting coconuts.
