= Phyllosticta theae =

Scientific classification
- Kingdom: Fungi
- Division: Ascomycota
- Class: Dothideomycetes
- Order: Botryosphaeriales
- Family: Botryosphaeriaceae
- Genus: Phyllosticta
- Species: P. theae

Binomial name
- Phyllosticta theae Speschnew (1904)

Species of fungus

Phyllosticta theae is a fungal plant pathogen infecting tea.
