= Phyllosticta lentisci =

Scientific classification
- Kingdom: Fungi
- Division: Ascomycota
- Class: Dothideomycetes
- Order: Botryosphaeriales
- Family: Botryosphaeriaceae
- Genus: Phyllosticta
- Species: P. lentisci

Binomial name
- Phyllosticta lentisci (Pass.) Allesch. (1913)

Species of fungus

Phyllosticta lentisci is a fungal plant pathogen infecting pistachio.
