= List of cattleya diseases =

This is a list of diseases of cattleya (Cattleya spp.).

== Bacterial diseases ==
Bacterial diseases
Bacterial soft rot	Erwinia carotovora subsp. carotovora = Pectobacterium carotovorum
Brown spot	Acidovorax avenae subsp. cattleyae = Pseudomonas cattleyae

== Fungal diseases ==
Fungal diseases
Anthracnose	Colletotrichum crassipes Glomerella cingulata Colletotrichum gloeosporioides [anamorph] Gloeosporium cattleyae
Basal rot	Sclerotium rolfsii
Black rot	Phytophthora cactorum Pythium ultimum
Bloom shoot necrosis	Alternaria sp.
Dieback	Botryodiplodia oncidii
Flyspeck	Schizothyrium perexiguum
Gray mold	Botrytis cinerea Botryotinia fuckeliana [teleomorph]
Leaf necrosis	Curvularia sp.
Leaf rot	Pythium splendens
Leaf spot	Alternaria sp. Cercospora angreci Cercospora odontoglossi Chaetodiplodia sp. Coniothyrium sp. Corynespora cassiicola Diplodia laelio-cattleyae Diploida paraphysaria Fulvia fulva Lasiodiplodia theobromae Leptothyrium sp. Phoma oncidii-sphacelati Phyllosticta capitalensis Pseudocercospora sp. Septoria selenophomoides
Pseudobulb and root rot	Fusarium oxysporum f. sp. cattleyae
Root and stem rot	Rhizoctonia solani
Root rot	Phytophthora palmivora
Rust	Sphenospora kevorkianii Uredo nigropuncta [anamorph] Uredo behnickiana

== Viral and viroid diseases ==
Viral and viroid diseases
Flower break	genus Tobamovirus, Odontoglossum ringspot virus (ORSV)
Mosaic	genus Potexvirus, Cymbidium mosaic virus (CymMV) genus Tobamovirus, Odontoglossum ringspot virus (ORSV)
White cell necrosis	genus Potexvirus, Cymbidium mosaic virus (CymMV)

== Miscellaneous diseases and disorders ==
Miscellaneous diseases and disorders
Algal spot	Cephaleuros virescens Kunze
Blind leads	Suboptimal light levels
Chlorotic leaf mottle	Iron deficiency
Dry sepal	Ethylene toxicity (> 2 – 50 ppb)
Edema	Edema
Mesophyll collapse	Low temperature exposure
No flowers	Extended low light periods on short-day plants
Pimpling	High light conditions
Sepal wilt	High soluble nitrogen or high levels of air-pollutants
Shriveling	Senescence of pseudobulbs
Slime molds	Fuligo spp.
Snow mold	Ptychogaster sp. (saprotroph)
Sooty blotch	Gloeodes pomigena
Sooty mold	Capnodium spp.
Sunburn	Sudden high light
Tip necrosis	Calcium deficiency
White streaking	Genetic flower break
