= Diplodia laelio-cattleyae =

Scientific classification
- Kingdom: Fungi
- Division: Ascomycota
- Class: Dothideomycetes
- Order: Botryosphaeriales
- Family: Botryosphaeriaceae
- Genus: Diplodia
- Species: D. laelio-cattleyae

Binomial name
- Diplodia laelio-cattleyae Sibilia, (1927)

Species of fungus

Diplodia laelio-cattleyae is a fungal plant pathogen.

== See also ==
- List of cattleya diseases
