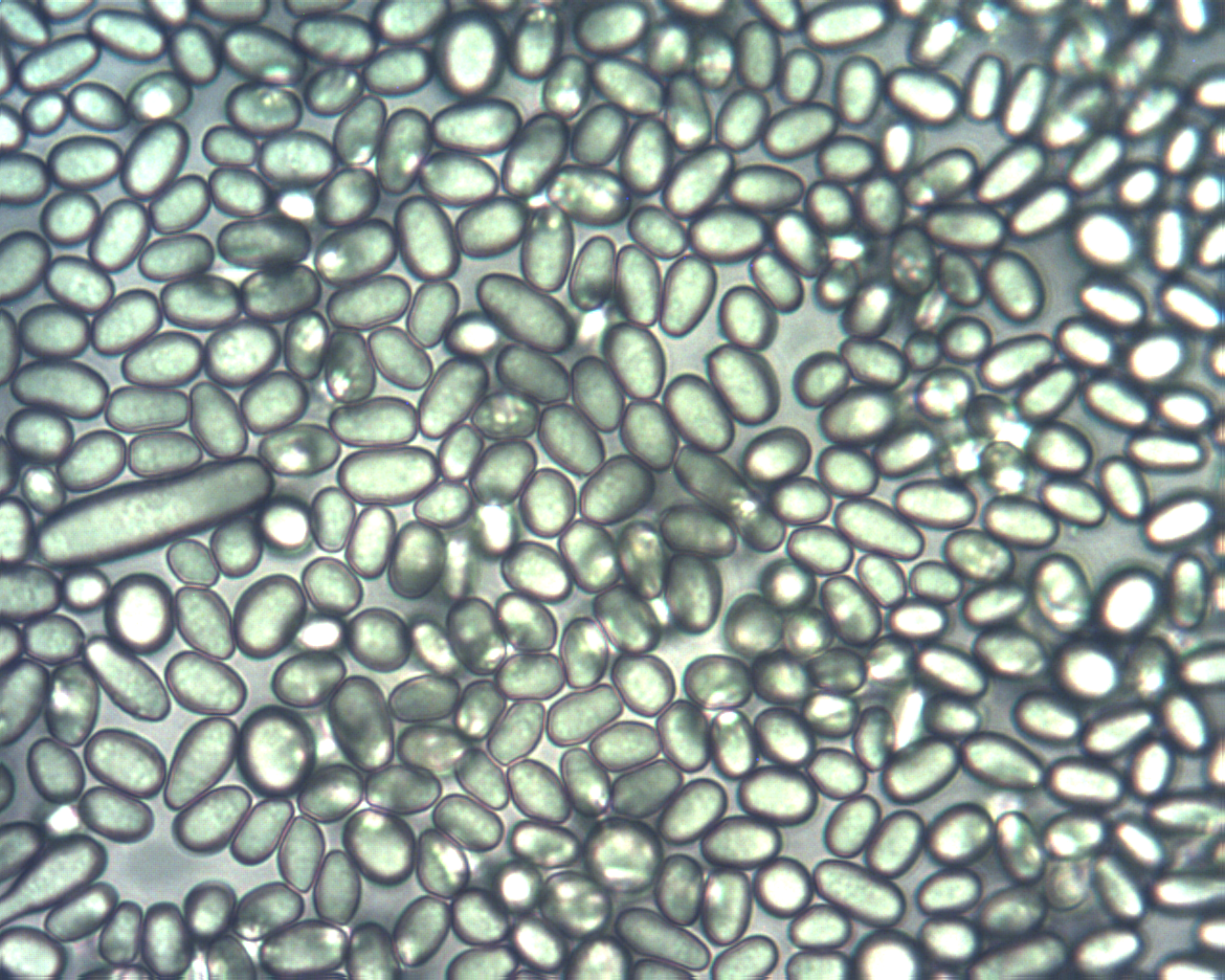

Scientific classification
- Kingdom: Fungi
- Division: Ascomycota
- Class: Dothideomycetes
- Order: Botryosphaeriales
- Family: Botryosphaeriaceae
- Genus: Diplodia
- Species: D. corticola

Binomial name
- Diplodia corticola A.J.L. Phillips, A. Alves & J. Luque

= Diplodia corticola =

Species of anamorphic fungi

Diplodia corticola, Commonly known as bot canker of oak; is a species of anamorphic fungus in the family Botryosphaeriaceae, an asexual stage of Botryosphaeria corticola. A fungus with both sexual and asexual reproductive cycles. Members of the Botryosphaeriaceae family are widely known as destructive pathogens of woody plants, including economically important crops grown for human consumption. They infect a wide range of fruit and nut trees, such as almonds, as well as various forest species.

== Secondary Metabolites ==
Known metabolites include sphaeropsidins B and C, (R)-mellein, and sapinofuranone B. Diplodia corticola also produces a range of secondary metabolites, including a newly identified compound, diplopyrone C, a 5,6-dihydropyran-2-one derivative. The fungus also synthesizes sphaeropsidin A, a pimarane diterpene known for its antimicrobial, herbicidal, and insecticidal properties.

== Geographic Distribution ==
Diplodia corticola is broadly distributed across the Mediterranean regions of Europe, as well as in North Africa and parts of North America, including Tennessee and several Mid-Atlantic states.

== Botryosphaeria Species ==
- Diplodia
  - B. corticola
    - B. corticola CBS112550
    - - B. dothidea AF027752
      - Botryosphaeria sp. AF027755
      - B. stevensii AF027754
      - B. quercuum AF243399
      - B. corticola CBS112549
      - B. corticola CBS110272
      - B. corticola CBS112547
      - B. corticola CBS678.88
      - D. quercina AF027753
      - B. corticola CBS112545
  - - B. obtusa/<br />D. sapinea
      - B. obtusa AB034812
      - S. sapinea AF243409
      - Diplodia sp. AJ292761
      - S. sapinea AF027756
      - B. obtusa CBS112556
      - - B. obtusa AF027759
        - B. obtusa AF243408
        - B. obtusa CBS112555
    - - - B. tsugae AF243405
        - - - B. rhodina AF027761
            - B. rhodina AF027762
          - - S. sapinea AF243402
            - B. stevensii AF243403
      - - B. stevensii AF243406
        - B, stevensii CBS112553

== Pathology ==
Diplodia corticola primarily affects oak trees, causing symptoms such as dieback, cankers, and vascular discoloration. It is considered a pathogen that infects trees that have been weakened by environmental stressors such as climatic (drought), biological and chemical stressors or previous diseases. Recent studies have highlighted its involvement in oak decline in regions such as Tennessee, United States of America, where it was identified as the causative agent of dieback in Quercus alba (white oak) which are sources of significant ecological and commercial values in eastern North America.

Infected red and white oak species by diplodia corticola includes:

- Northern red oak (Quercus rubra)
- White oak (Quercus alba)
- Pin oak (Quercus palustris)
- Holm oak (Quercus ilex)
- Cork oak (Quercus suber)

The fungus causes several symptoms, including crown thinning, where the leaves become pale, smaller, and a decrease in numbers. Bark bleeding and cracking occur, characterized by dark stains and oozing lesions on the trunk. As well as, cankers and dieback, leading to the death of affected branches. Lastly, wood discoloration.
