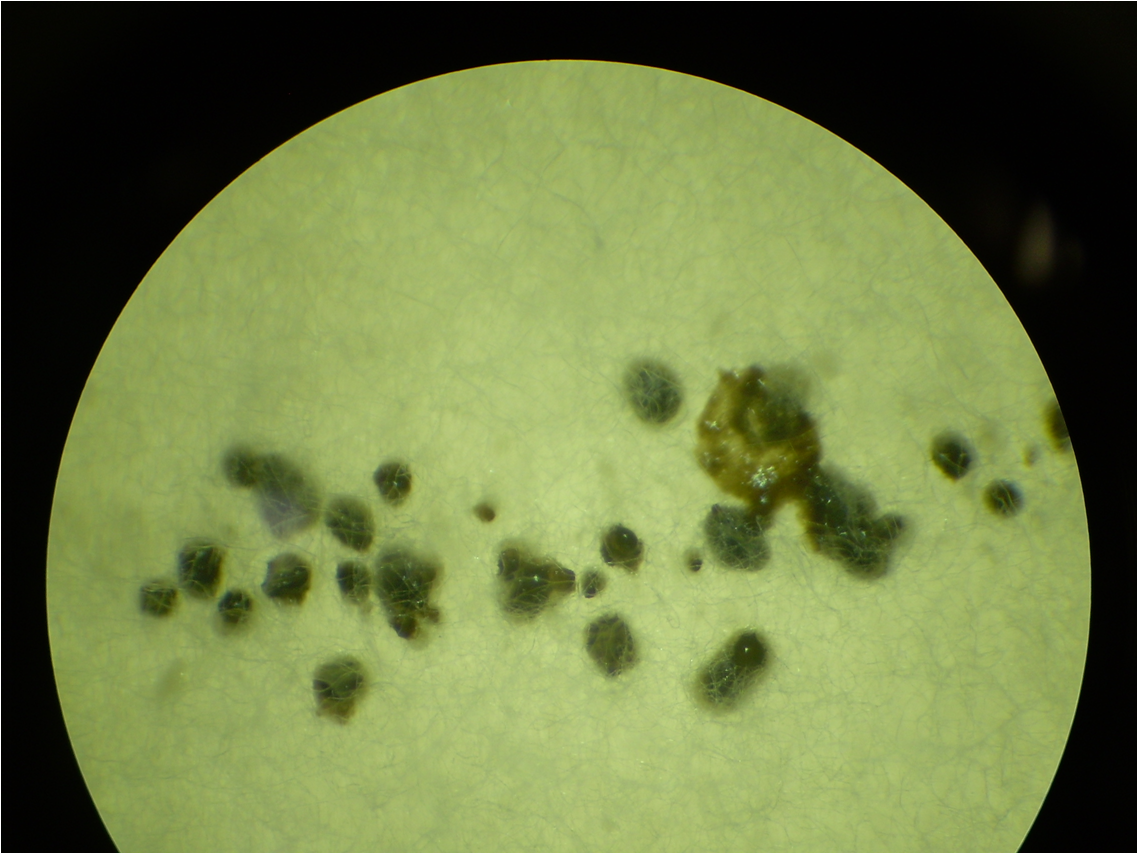
- Pycnidia of Diplodia hederae growing on a potato dextrose agar plate

Scientific classification
- Domain: Eukaryota
- Kingdom: Fungi
- Division: Ascomycota
- Class: Dothideomycetes
- Order: Botryosphaeriales
- Family: Botryosphaeriaceae
- Genus: Diplodia; Fr. 1834

Species
- See text

= Diplodia =

Genus of fungi

Diplodia is a genus of anamorphic fungi that is part of the family Botryosphaeriaceae.

== Species ==
- Diplodia abiegna
- Diplodia abrotani
- Diplodia abutilonis
- Diplodia acaciae
- Diplodia acaciarum
- Diplodia acanthophylli
- Diplodia acericola
- Diplodia acerina
- Diplodia aceris
- Diplodia acervata
- Diplodia acicola
- Diplodia aconiti
- Diplodia acori
- Diplodia actinonema
- Diplodia adelinensis
- Diplodia adenocarpi
- Diplodia adhatodae
- Diplodia adolinensis
- Diplodia aegyptiaca
- Diplodia aegyptica
- Diplodia aesculi
- Diplodia africana
- Diplodia agaves
- Diplodia agni-casti
- Diplodia agrifolia
- Diplodia agrostidis
- Diplodia ailanthi
- Diplodia ailanthina
- Diplodia akebiae
- Diplodia alaterni
- Diplodia albotecta
- Diplodia albozonata
- Diplodia alhagi
- Diplodia allocellula
- Diplodia alni
- Diplodia alni-rubrae
- Diplodia aloysiae
- Diplodia althaeae
- Diplodia amaranthi
- Diplodia amelanchieris
- Diplodia ammodendri
- Diplodia ampelina
- Diplodia ampelodesmi
- Diplodia ampelopidis
- Diplodia ampelopsidis
- Diplodia amphisphaerioides
- Diplodia amygdali
- Diplodia andamensis
- Diplodia andicola
- Diplodia andrachnes
- Diplodia androsaemi
- Diplodia annonae
- Diplodia annonicola
- Diplodia anomala
- Diplodia anthophila
- Diplodia antiqua
- Diplodia aparines
- Diplodia apiospora
- Diplodia apiosporioides
- Diplodia aquifolia
- Diplodia arachidis
- Diplodia arachnoidea
- Diplodia araucariae
- Diplodia arctii
- Diplodia arecae
- Diplodia arecina
- Diplodia arengocarpa
- Diplodia argentina
- Diplodia argyreiae
- Diplodia aristolochiae
- Diplodia aristolochiae-siphoriis
- Diplodia arthrophylli
- Diplodia artocarpi
- Diplodia artocarpina
- Diplodia arundinacea
- Diplodia asclepiadea
- Diplodia ascochytoides
- Diplodia ascochytula
- Diplodia asparagi
- Diplodia asrocaryi
- Diplodia assumptionis
- Diplodia asterigmatica
- Diplodia asterisci
- Diplodia astragali
- Diplodia astrocaryi
- Diplodia astrodauci
- Diplodia atlantica
- Diplodia atra
- Diplodia atramentaria
- Diplodia atrata
- Diplodia atrobrunnea
- Diplodia atrocoerulea
- Diplodia atropae
- Diplodia aucubae
- Diplodia aucubciola
- Diplodia aucubicola
- Diplodia auerswaldii
- Diplodia aurantii
- Diplodia australiae
- Diplodia australis
- Diplodia auwata
- Diplodia baccaridicola
- Diplodia baccaridis
- Diplodia baccharidicola
- Diplodia baccharidis
- Diplodia bacchi
- Diplodia bambusae
- Diplodia bambusina
- Diplodia barringtoniae
- Diplodia bauhiniae
- Diplodia beckii
- Diplodia benzoina
- Diplodia berberidina
- Diplodia berberidis
- Diplodia berkeleyi
- Diplodia bessimyanii
- Diplodia betae
- Diplodia beticola
- Diplodia betulae
- Diplodia bignoniae
- Diplodia biparasitica
- Diplodia boldoae
- Diplodia bombacina
- Diplodia borealis
- Diplodia bougainvilleae
- Diplodia boyeri
- Diplodia brachypodii
- Diplodia brachyspora
- Diplodia brassicae
- Diplodia bresadolae
- Diplodia briardii
- Diplodia broussonetiae
- Diplodia bryoniae
- Diplodia buddlejae
- Diplodia bulbicola
- Diplodia bumeliae
- Diplodia buteae
- Diplodia butleri
- Diplodia buxella
- Diplodia buxi
- Diplodia buxicola
- Diplodia cacti
- Diplodia cactorum
- Diplodia caerulescens
- Diplodia caesii
- Diplodia caespitosa
- Diplodia caffra
- Diplodia cajani
- Diplodia calamagrostidis
- Diplodia calami
- Diplodia calamicola
- Diplodia calaminthae
- Diplodia calecutiana
- Diplodia calligoni
- Diplodia calotropidis
- Diplodia calycanthi
- Diplodia calycotomes
- Diplodia calycotomes-villosae
- Diplodia camelliae
- Diplodia camelliaecola
- Diplodia camphorae
- Diplodia canthiifolia
- Diplodia capparis
- Diplodia caraganae
- Diplodia caricae
- Diplodia caricina
- Diplodia carissae
- Diplodia carpini
- Diplodia carpinicola
- Diplodia carpogena
- Diplodia carpophila
- Diplodia caryigena
- Diplodia cassiae-multijugae
- Diplodia cassinopsidis
- Diplodia castaneae
- Diplodia catalpae
- Diplodia catappae
- Diplodia catappe
- Diplodia catechu
- Diplodia cathartocarpi
- Diplodia caucasici
- Diplodia caulicola
- Diplodia cavanillesiana
- Diplodia ceanothe
- Diplodia ceanothi
- Diplodia cedrelae
- Diplodia celastri
- Diplodia celastrina
- Diplodia celottiana
- Diplodia celtidigena
- Diplodia celtidis
- Diplodia celtigena
- Diplodia centrophila
- Diplodia cerasorum
- Diplodia ceratocarpi
- Diplodia ceratoniae
- Diplodia cercidis
- Diplodia cercidis-chinensis
- Diplodia cerei-triangularis
- Diplodia cesarorum
- Diplodia chaetomioides
- Diplodia chenopodii
- Diplodia chimonanthi
- Diplodia chionanthi
- Diplodia chrysanthemella
- Diplodia chrysanthemi
- Diplodia ciceris
- Diplodia cinchonae
- Diplodia cincta
- Diplodia cinnamomi
- Diplodia cirsii-igniarii
- Diplodia cisticola
- Diplodia cistina
- Diplodia citharexyli
- Diplodia citri
- Diplodia citricola
- Diplodia citrina
- Diplodia cladrastidis
- Diplodia clandestina
- Diplodia clavispora
- Diplodia clavuligera
- Diplodia clematidea
- Diplodia clematidis
- Diplodia cocculi
- Diplodia cococarpa
- Diplodia cocoina
- Diplodia coffaeiphila
- Diplodia coffeae
- Diplodia coffeicola
- Diplodia coicis
- Diplodia colletiae
- Diplodia coluteae
- Diplodia comari
- Diplodia compacta
- Diplodia compressa
- Diplodia confluens
- Diplodia congesta
- Diplodia consimilis
- Diplodia consociata
- Diplodia consors
- Diplodia constricta
- Diplodia consueloi
- Diplodia convolvuli
- Diplodia cookei
- Diplodia corchori
- Diplodia corni
- Diplodia coronillae
- Diplodia corticola
- Diplodia corydalis
- Diplodia coryli
- Diplodia corylina
- Diplodia coryphae
- Diplodia cowdellii
- Diplodia crassulae
- Diplodia crebra
- Diplodia croatica
- Diplodia crus-galli
- Diplodia crustacea
- Diplodia cucurbitaceae
- Diplodia culmorum
- Diplodia cupressi
- Diplodia cupressina
- Diplodia curreyi
- Diplodia cyanostroma
- Diplodia cycadis
- Diplodia cydoniae
- Diplodia cylindrospora
- Diplodia cynanchina
- Diplodia cyparissa
- Diplodia cytisi
- Diplodia cytosporioides
- Diplodia cytosporoides
- Diplodia daemiae
- Diplodia dalbergiae
- Diplodia daturae
- Diplodia dearnessii
- Diplodia decorticata
- Diplodia deodarae
- Diplodia depazeoides
- Diplodia destruens
- Diplodia deutziae
- Diplodia diacanthina
- Diplodia dianthi
- Diplodia diatrype
- Diplodia diospyri
- Diplodia discriminanda
- Diplodia ditior
- Diplodia diversa
- Diplodia diversispora
- Diplodia dorycnea
- Diplodia dorycnii
- Diplodia dracaenae
- Diplodia dracaenicola
- Diplodia drepanocladi
- Diplodia dryadea
- Diplodia dulcamarae
- Diplodia durantae
- Diplodia durionis
- Diplodia edgworthiae
- Diplodia ehretiae
- Diplodia elaeagnella
- Diplodia elaeagni
- Diplodia elaeophila
- Diplodia elaeospora
- Diplodia elastica
- Diplodia embryopteridis
- Diplodia emeri
- Diplodia ephedrae
- Diplodia ephedricola
- Diplodia epherdricola
- Diplodia epicocos
- Diplodia epilobii
- Diplodia equiseti
- Diplodia equisetina
- Diplodia erebia
- Diplodia eriobotryae
- Diplodia eritrichi
- Diplodia eructans
- Diplodia eucalypti
- Diplodia eugenioides
- Diplodia euonymi
- Diplodia euphorbiae
- Diplodia eustaga
- Diplodia euterpes
- Diplodia exochordae
- Diplodia extensa
- Diplodia fabianae
- Diplodia fabiformis
- Diplodia fabriciae
- Diplodia faginea
- Diplodia fairmanii
- Diplodia farnesiana
- Diplodia fecundissima
- Diplodia fibricola
- Diplodia fibriseda
- Diplodia ficina
- Diplodia fici-religiosae
- Diplodia fici-retusae
- Diplodia ficophila
- Diplodia fissa
- Diplodia foeniculina
- Diplodia foliicola
- Diplodia foliorum
- Diplodia forsythiae
- Diplodia foucaudii
- Diplodia frangulae
- Diplodia fraxini
- Diplodia fructigena
- Diplodia fructus-pandani
- Diplodia frumenti
- Diplodia fuchsiae
- Diplodia fulvella
- Diplodia fumanae
- Diplodia galactis
- Diplodia galbulorum
- Diplodia gales
- Diplodia gali
- Diplodia galii
- Diplodia gayi
- Diplodia genistae-tinctoriae
- Diplodia genistarum
- Diplodia georginae
- Diplodia germanica
- Diplodia gigantea
- Diplodia glandicola
- Diplodia gleditschiae
- Diplodia globulosa
- Diplodia gmelinae
- Diplodia gongrogena
- Diplodia gossypii
- Diplodia grevilleae
- Diplodia grewiae
- Diplodia grossulariae
- Diplodia guaranitica
- Diplodia guayaci
- Diplodia guineae
- Diplodia gymnosporiae
- Diplodia gymnosporina
- Diplodia halimodendri
- Diplodia halleriae
- Diplodia haloxyli
- Diplodia hamamelidis
- Diplodia hapiopappi
- Diplodia haplopappi
- Diplodia harknessii
- Diplodia hederae
- Diplodia helianthemi
- Diplodia helichrysi
- Diplodia hellebori
- Diplodia henriquesiana
- Diplodia henriquesii
- Diplodia herbarum
- Diplodia herbicola
- Diplodia hesperidica
- Diplodia heteroclita
- Diplodia heteromelina
- Diplodia heteromorpha
- Diplodia heterospora
- Diplodia heufleri
- Diplodia hibisci
- Diplodia hibiscina
- Diplodia hippophaëarum
- Diplodia hirtella
- Diplodia hortensis
- Diplodia hoveniae
- Diplodia humuli
- Diplodia hungarica
- Diplodia hurae
- Diplodia hyoscyamicola
- Diplodia hyperiana
- Diplodia hypericina
- Diplodia hypoxyloidea
- Diplodia hypoxyloides
- Diplodia hyssopi
- Diplodia ilicicola
- Diplodia ilicina
- Diplodia imperialis
- Diplodia incarvilleae
- Diplodia inconspicua
- Diplodia incrustans
- Diplodia indica
- Diplodia indigoferae
- Diplodia infuscans
- Diplodia inocarpi
- Diplodia insculpta
- Diplodia insitiva
- Diplodia interrogativa
- Diplodia intertrappea
- Diplodia inulae
- Diplodia ipomoeae
- Diplodia ischaemi
- Diplodia ivicola
- Diplodia jasmini
- Diplodia jasminicola
- Diplodia jatrophae
- Diplodia juglandina
- Diplodia juglandis
- Diplodia julibrisin
- Diplodia juniperi
- Diplodia kaki
- Diplodia kalopanacis
- Diplodia kansensis
- Diplodia kerensis
- Diplodia kernsis
- Diplodia kerriae
- Diplodia koelreuteriae
- Diplodia kravtzevii
- Diplodia lablab
- Diplodia laelio-cattleyae
- Diplodia lagenariae
- Diplodia lagerstroemiae
- Diplodia laminariana
- Diplodia landolphiae
- Diplodia langloisii
- Diplodia lantanae
- Diplodia lantanicola
- Diplodia lappulae
- Diplodia lata
- Diplodia lathyri
- Diplodia laureaia
- Diplodia laureolae
- Diplodia laurina
- Diplodia laurocerasi
- Diplodia lecanorae
- Diplodia lecythea
- Diplodia leguminis-cytisi
- Diplodia leguminum
- Diplodia leptodactyli
- Diplodia leptospora
- Diplodia libera
- Diplodia licalis
- Diplodia lichenopsis
- Diplodia ligniaria
- Diplodia lignicola
- Diplodia ligustri
- Diplodia ligustricola
- Diplodia lilacis
- Diplodia linariae
- Diplodia linderae
- Diplodia liriodendri
- Diplodia litseae
- Diplodia loculata
- Diplodia longipedicellata
- Diplodia longispora
- Diplodia longloisii
- Diplodia lonicerae
- Diplodia lophiostomatoides
- Diplodia loranthi
- Diplodia lulibrissin
- Diplodia lunariae
- Diplodia lupini
- Diplodia luteobrunnea
- Diplodia lyciella
- Diplodia lycii
- Diplodia maclurae
- Diplodia macropyrena
- Diplodia macrosperma
- Diplodia macrostoma
- Diplodia maculans
- Diplodia maculata
- Diplodia maculicola
- Diplodia magnoliae
- Diplodia magnoliicola
- Diplodia mahoniae
- Diplodia malloti
- Diplodia malorum
- Diplodia mamillana
- Diplodia mamma
- Diplodia mandorae
- Diplodia mandorei
- Diplodia mangiferae
- Diplodia manginii
- Diplodia mangostanae
- Diplodia manihoti
- Diplodia marsdeniae
- Diplodia marumiae
- Diplodia maura
- Diplodia maydis
- Diplodia medicaginis
- Diplodia megalospora
- Diplodia melaena
- Diplodia meliae
- Diplodia menthae
- Diplodia mespilana
- Diplodia mespili
- Diplodia mespilina
- Diplodia metasequoiae
- Diplodia micheliae
- Diplodia microscopica
- Diplodia microspora
- Diplodia microsporella
- Diplodia millegrana
- Diplodia mimosae
- Diplodia mimosae-himalayanae
- Diplodia minor
- Diplodia minutissima
- Diplodia mitylospora
- Diplodia mixta
- Diplodia moelleriana
- Diplodia monsterae
- Diplodia mori
- Diplodia moricola
- Diplodia morina
- Diplodia moringae
- Diplodia morreniae
- Diplodia muehlenbeckiae
- Diplodia multicarpa
- Diplodia multijugae
- Diplodia musae
- Diplodia muscicola
- Diplodia mygindae
- Diplodia myricae
- Diplodia myrsines
- Diplodia myxosporioides
- Diplodia nanophyti
- Diplodia negundinis
- Diplodia nematospora
- Diplodia nerii
- Diplodia nigricans
- Diplodia nitens
- Diplodia noaeae
- Diplodia novae-hollandiae
- Diplodia nucis
- Diplodia nutans
- Diplodia nuttalliae
- Diplodia obiones
- Diplodia oblonga
- Diplodia obsoleta
- Diplodia ochromae
- Diplodia ochrosiae
- Diplodia oenocarpi
- Diplodia oenotherae
- Diplodia officinalis
- Diplodia oleae
- Diplodia oleandri
- Diplodia olivarum
- Diplodia onobrychidis
- Diplodia oospora
- Diplodia opuli
- Diplodia opuntiae
- Diplodia orae-maris
- Diplodia orchidis
- Diplodia organicola
- Diplodia oryzae
- Diplodia oryzina
- Diplodia osteospora
- Diplodia ostryae
- Diplodia osyridella
- Diplodia osyridis
- Diplodia otthiana
- Diplodia oudemansii
- Diplodia oxalidis
- Diplodia oxylobii
- Diplodia oxystelmatis
- Diplodia padi
- Diplodia padina
- Diplodia palinarum
- Diplodia paliuri
- Diplodia palmarum
- Diplodia palmicola
- Diplodia pamirica
- Diplodia panacis
- Diplodia pandani
- Diplodia papayae
- Diplodia papillosa
- Diplodia pappiana
- Diplodia paradisiaca
- Diplodia paraphysaria
- Diplodia paraphysata
- Diplodia parkinsoniae
- Diplodia passeriniana
- Diplodia passiflorae
- Diplodia passifloricola
- Diplodia patellaris
- Diplodia paulowniae
- Diplodia paupercula
- Diplodia pedilanthi
- Diplodia pellica
- Diplodia pentatropidis
- Diplodia periglandis
- Diplodia periplocae
- Diplodia peristrophes
- Diplodia perseana
- Diplodia persicae
- Diplodia persicina
- Diplodia petiolaris
- Diplodia petiolorum
- Diplodia phaseolina
- Diplodia phellodendri
- Diplodia philadelphi
- Diplodia phillyreae
- Diplodia philodendri
- Diplodia phloeospora
- Diplodia phoenicicola
- Diplodia phoradendri
- Diplodia phormicola
- Diplodia photiniae
- Diplodia photiniicola
- Diplodia phyllactinia
- Diplodia phyllactiniae
- Diplodia phyllarthri
- Diplodia phyllodii
- Diplodia phyllodiorum
- Diplodia phyllostictae
- Diplodia pinnarum
- Diplodia piriformis
- Diplodia pistaciae
- Diplodia pithecellobii
- Diplodia plantani
- Diplodia plantanicola
- Diplodia platani
- Diplodia platanicola
- Diplodia plumbaginis
- Diplodia pollacciana
- Diplodia polyalthicola
- Diplodia polygoni
- Diplodia polygoni-baldschuanici
- Diplodia polygoni-bucharici
- Diplodia polygonicola
- Diplodia polymorpha
- Diplodia populina
- Diplodia porlieriae
- Diplodia possifloricola
- Diplodia potentillae
- Diplodia poterii
- Diplodia preussii
- Diplodia profusa
- Diplodia prosopidina
- Diplodia pruni
- Diplodia prunicola
- Diplodia pseudodiplodia
- Diplodia pseudoseriata
- Diplodia pseudosphaeropsis
- Diplodia psidii
- Diplodia psoraleae
- Diplodia pteleae
- Diplodia pterocarpi
- Diplodia pterocaryae
- Diplodia pterophila
- Diplodia punctata
- Diplodia punctifolia
- Diplodia punctipetiola
- Diplodia punicae
- Diplodia pusilla
- Diplodia pustulata
- Diplodia pustulosa
- Diplodia pyrenophora
- Diplodia pyricola
- Diplodia quercella
- Diplodia rabatica
- Diplodia radicalis
- Diplodia radicicola
- Diplodia radicina
- Diplodia radiciperda
- Diplodia radula
- Diplodia ramulicola
- Diplodia rapax
- Diplodia ravenelii
- Diplodia recifensis
- Diplodia rehmii
- Diplodia resurgens
- Diplodia rhamni
- Diplodia rhamni-alaterni
- Diplodia rheae
- Diplodia rhizogena
- Diplodia rhizophila
- Diplodia rhodocarpa
- Diplodia rhododendri
- Diplodia rhodophila
- Diplodia rhodotypi
- Diplodia rhoina
- Diplodia rhois
- Diplodia rhosaecarpa
- Diplodia ribis
- Diplodia ricinella
- Diplodia ricini
- Diplodia robiniae
- Diplodia rodei
- Diplodia rosae
- Diplodia rosaecarpa
- Diplodia rosarum
- Diplodia rosmarini
- Diplodia rosulata
- Diplodia roumeguerei
- Diplodia rubi
- Diplodia rubicola
- Diplodia ruborum
- Diplodia rudis
- Diplodia rumicina
- Diplodia rusci
- Diplodia rutae
- Diplodia ruticola
- Diplodia saccharicola
- Diplodia saccharina
- Diplodia sacchari-spontanei
- Diplodia sahnii
- Diplodia salicella
- Diplodia salicina
- Diplodia salicis
- Diplodia salicorniae
- Diplodia salsolae
- Diplodia salvadorina
- Diplodia salviae
- Diplodia sambuci
- Diplodia sambucicola
- Diplodia sambucina
- Diplodia sansevieriae
- Diplodia sapii
- Diplodia sarajevensis
- Diplodia sarmentorum
- Diplodia sarocococcae
- Diplodia sarothamni
- Diplodia sassafras
- Diplodia saxauli
- Diplodia scabra
- Diplodia scabrosa
- Diplodia scheidweileri
- Diplodia sclerotiorum
- Diplodia scoparii
- Diplodia scorzonerae
- Diplodia scrobiculata De Wet et al., 2003
- Diplodia seaforthiae
- Diplodia secalis
- Diplodia sedicola
- Diplodia segapelii
- Diplodia segapelli
- Diplodia seminula
- Diplodia seriata
- Diplodia shearii
- Diplodia sicula
- Diplodia sidae
- Diplodia sideritidis
- Diplodia siliquastri
- Diplodia silybi-mariani
- Diplodia simmonsii
- Diplodia siphonis
- Diplodia sipolisiae
- Diplodia smilacella
- Diplodia smilacina
- Diplodia solani
- Diplodia solanicola
- Diplodia sophorae
- Diplodia sorbi
- Diplodia sparsa
- Diplodia spartii
- Diplodia spegazziniana
- Diplodia sphaerospora
- Diplodia spinulosae
- Diplodia spiraeae
- Diplodia spiraeicola
- Diplodia spiraeina
- Diplodia spurca
- Diplodia stachydis
- Diplodia stangeriae
- Diplodia staphyleae
- Diplodia stenocarpi
- Diplodia stenospora
- Diplodia sterculiae
- Diplodia stevenii
- Diplodia striata
- Diplodia styracis
- Diplodia subcuticularis
- Diplodia suberina
- Diplodia subglobata
- Diplodia subseriata
- Diplodia subsolitaria
- Diplodia subtecta
- Diplodia subtectoides
- Diplodia subterranea
- Diplodia subtilis
- Diplodia suttonii
- Diplodia sycina
- Diplodia syconophila
- Diplodia sydowiana
- Diplodia symphoricarpi
- Diplodia synedrellae
- Diplodia syriaca
- Diplodia syringae
- Diplodia tagetis-erectae
- Diplodia tamaricina
- Diplodia tamarindica
- Diplodia tanaceti
- Diplodia tarentina
- Diplodia tassiana
- Diplodia taxi
- Diplodia tecomae
- Diplodia tecomiae
- Diplodia tecta
- Diplodia tenuis
- Diplodia tephrostoma
- Diplodia teucrii
- Diplodia thalassia
- Diplodia thalictri
- Diplodia thalictricola
- Diplodia theae-sinensis
- Diplodia thesii
- Diplodia thevetiae
- Diplodia thujae
- Diplodia thujana
- Diplodia thymelaeae
- Diplodia thymeteae
- Diplodia thymi
- Diplodia thyoidea
- Diplodia tiliae
- Diplodia tini
- Diplodia togashiana
- Diplodia torreyae
- Diplodia torreyae-californicae
- Diplodia trachelospermi
- Diplodia tragiae
- Diplodia traversiana
- Diplodia trevoae
- Diplodia trichini
- Diplodia trichinii
- Diplodia truncata
- Diplodia tulipiferae
- Diplodia tumefaciens
- Diplodia tylostomatis
- Diplodia typhina
- Diplodia ulcinjensis
- Diplodia ulicis
- Diplodia ulmi
- Diplodia umbellulariae
- Diplodia unedinis
- Diplodia unedonis
- Diplodia uredinicola
- Diplodia ureniana
- Diplodia uvariae
- Diplodia uvicola
- Diplodia uvulariae
- Diplodia vaccinii
- Diplodia valsoides
- Diplodia variispora
- Diplodia veratri
- Diplodia verbenacea
- Diplodia veronensis
- Diplodia veronicae
- Diplodia viburnicola
- Diplodia viciae
- Diplodia vignae
- Diplodia vincae
- Diplodia vincaecola
- Diplodia vineae
- Diplodia virginiana
- Diplodia viscicola
- Diplodia vulgaris
- Diplodia warburgiana
- Diplodia watsoniana
- Diplodia weigelae
- Diplodia weyhei
- Diplodia wisteriae
- Diplodia withaniae
- Diplodia wurthii
- Diplodia xanthii
- Diplodia xanthoceratis
- Diplodia yerbae
- Diplodia yuccae
- Diplodia zanthoxyli
- Diplodia zebrina
- Diplodia zeicola
- Diplodia zeylanica
- Diplodia ziziphina
- Diplodia zygophylli
