= Uredo kriegeriana =

Scientific classification
- Domain: Eukaryota
- Kingdom: Fungi
- Division: Basidiomycota
- Class: Pucciniomycetes
- Order: Pucciniales
- Family: Pucciniaceae
- Genus: Uredo
- Species: U. kriegeriana

Binomial name
- Uredo kriegeriana Syd. & P. Syd. (1902)

Species of fungus

Uredo kriegeriana is a fungal plant pathogen infecting hemp.
