= Diplodia theae-sinensis =

Scientific classification
- Kingdom: Fungi
- Division: Ascomycota
- Class: Dothideomycetes
- Order: Botryosphaeriales
- Family: Botryosphaeriaceae
- Genus: Diplodia
- Species: D. theae-sinensis

Binomial name
- Diplodia theae-sinensis S.Q.Liu & T.Q.Li, (1988)

Species of fungus

Diplodia theae-sinensis is a plant pathogen.
