= Diplodia manihoti =

Scientific classification
- Kingdom: Fungi
- Division: Ascomycota
- Class: Dothideomycetes
- Order: Botryosphaeriales
- Family: Botryosphaeriaceae
- Genus: Diplodia
- Species: D. manihoti

Binomial name
- Diplodia manihoti Sacc. [as 'maniothi'], (1914)

Species of fungus

Diplodia manihoti is a plant pathogen.
