= Diplodia allocellula =

Scientific classification
- Kingdom: Fungi
- Division: Ascomycota
- Class: Dothideomycetes
- Order: Botryosphaeriales
- Family: Botryosphaeriaceae
- Genus: Diplodia
- Species: D. allocellula

Binomial name
- Diplodia allocellula Jami, Gryzenh., Slippers & M.J.Wingf. (2012)

Species of fungus

Diplodia allocellula is an endophytic fungus that might be a latent pathogen. It was found on Acacia karroo, a common tree in southern Africa.
