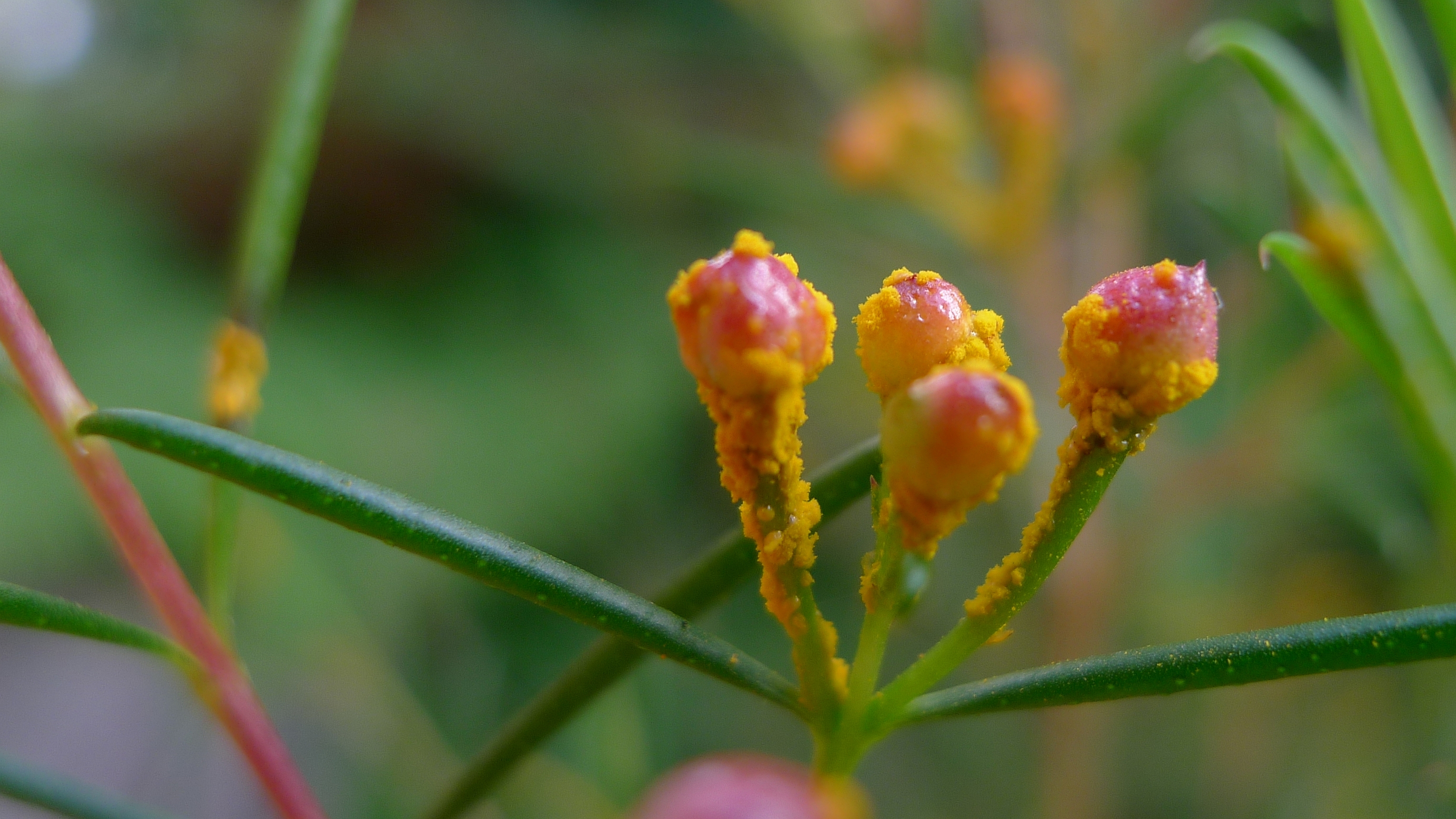
- Uredo rangelii ("Myrtle rust")

Scientific classification
- Kingdom: Fungi
- Division: Basidiomycota
- Class: Pucciniomycetes
- Order: Pucciniales
- Family: Pucciniaceae
- Genus: Uredo; Pers.

= Uredo =

Genus of fungi

Uredo is a genus of rust fungi: long considered incertae sedis in the order Pucciniales, but now placed in the family Pucciniaceae. This long-established genus, together with the closely related Uromyces (which some authorities consider to be synonymous), give their names to "uredo-type" fungal spore structures such as "urediniospore" and uredinium".

== Taxonomy ==
The classification of fungal taxa based on only morphological characteristics has long been recognised as problematical, so the Pucciniales have been reviewed over long-term studies using three DNA loci. In the 2021 and other studies, a substantial number of species have been placed in other genera including Puccinia, Hemileia, Ravenelia and Uromyces: including the original type species: Uredo betae Pers., 1801. On the other hand, species have also been transferred here from other genera, sometimes in different families. For example, Uredo cryptostegiae (better known as Maravalia cryptostegiae and also Scopella cryptostegiae), was provisionally placed here; it has been used as a biological control agent against invasive rubber-vine, Cryptostegia grandiflora.

== Species ==
As of 2023, Species Fungorum includes the following as valid (out of approximately 1600 species names):

1. Uredo abdita H.S. Jacks. (1922)
2. Uredo abri Henn. (1908)
3. Uredo aburiensis Cummins (1952)
4. Uredo acaciae-concinnae Kapoor bis & D.K. Agarwal (1975)
5. Uredo acalyphae Speg. (1926)
6. Uredo acalyphae-fruticosae T.S. Ramakr., Sriniv. & Sundaram (1952)
7. Uredo achyranthicola Cummins (1945)
8. Uredo acori Racib. (1900)
9. Uredo acriuli Syd. & P. Syd. (1903)
10. Uredo adapertilis Cummins (1940)
11. Uredo aeluropodina Maire (1917)
12. Uredo affinis Speg. (1880)
13. Uredo aframomi Har. & Pat. (1911)
14. Uredo agerati Mayor (1914)
15. Uredo agnostoica Speg. (1908)
16. Uredo agrostidis Arthur & Cummins (1936)
17. Uredo agrostidis-myrianthae S.X. Wei (1989)
18. Uredo agrostidis-rupestris E. Fisch. (1924)
19. Uredo akaisiensis Hara (1930)
20. Uredo alemquerensis Speg. (1922)
21. Uredo allmaniae P.B. Chavan & U.V. Kulk. (1975)
22. Uredo allophyli Henn. (1904)
23. Uredo alpestris J. Schröt. (1875)
24. Uredo alternantherae H.S. Jacks. & Holw. (1927)
25. Uredo alysicarpi Doidge (1927)
26. Uredo amagensis Mayor (1914)
1. Uredo amami-oshimaensis Morim. (1956)
2. Uredo amaniensis Henn. (1905)
3. Uredo amapaensis J.F. Hennen & Sotão (1996)
4. Uredo amazonensis Henn. (1905)
5. Uredo amicosa Arthur (1919)
6. Uredo amitostigmatis Hirats. f. & Hashioka (1935)
7. Uredo ammopiptanthi Domashova & Gamalizk. (1962)
8. Uredo amomi Petch (1912)
9. Uredo anacardii Mains (1935)
10. Uredo andropogonicola Speg. (1909)
11. Uredo andropogonis-gabonensis J.M. Yen (1974)
12. Uredo andropogonis-gayani Eboh (1978)
13. Uredo andropogonis-zeylanici Petch (1917)
14. Uredo angusii Cummins (1960)
15. Uredo anisomelis Bagyan., Gjaerum & M. Raju (2003)
16. Uredo anthistiriae Petch (1912)
17. Uredo anthistiriae-tremulae Petch (1912)
18. Uredo antidesmatis Racib. (1900)
19. Uredo apacheca R.S. Peterson (1967)
20. Uredo aphelandrae H.S. Jacks. & Holw. (1932)
21. Uredo apocynaceae Henn. (1908)
22. Uredo archeriana F. Kern, Cif. & Thurst. (1933)
23. Uredo arcytophylli Cummins (1945)
24. Uredo arenariae-ciliatae Dupias (1958)
25. Uredo argyreiae Petch (1922)
26. Uredo aristidae-acutiflorae Maire (1949)
27. Uredo artabotrydis Syd. & P. Syd. (1913)
28. Uredo artemisiae-japonicae Dietel (1905)
29. Uredo arthraxonis-ciliaris Henn. (1908)
30. Uredo arundinellae-nepalensis Cummins (1945)
31. Uredo arundinis-donacis F.L. Tai (1947)
32. Uredo asclepiadina Speg. (1909)
33. Uredo asclepiadis-fruticosae Doidge (1927)
34. Uredo aspalathi Mennicken & Oberw. (2004)
35. Uredo aspiliae-latifoliae Cummins (1941)
36. Uredo assamensis Syd. & P. Syd. (1907)
37. Uredo assumptionis Speg. (1922)
38. Uredo asteris-ageratoidis J.Y. Zhuang & S.X. Wei (2018)
39. Uredo asteromoeae Henn. (1902)
40. Uredo asystasiae Henn. (1905)
41. Uredo augeae Pole-Evans (1915)
42. Uredo auletica Speg. (1902)
43. Uredo aurantiaca Montemart. (1902)
44. Uredo autumnalis Dietel (1905)
45. Uredo avenae-pratensis Erikss. (1923)
46. Uredo avenochloae Z. Urb. (1963)
47. Uredo aztecana R.S. Peterson (1965)
48. Uredo baccharidis-anomalae Mayor (1914)
49. Uredo balaensis Syd. & P. Syd. (1903)
50. Uredo bambusae-nanae J.M. Yen (1970)
51. Uredo bambusae-ventricosae J.M. Yen (1973)
52. Uredo banisteriicola Henn. (1904)
53. Uredo baphiae-nitidae J.M. Yen & Gilles (1976)
54. Uredo baruensis J.R. Hern. & Aime (2005)
55. Uredo batistae J.C. Lindq. (1972)
56. Uredo beloperones Arthur (1910)
57. Uredo betae-patellaris Guyot & Malençon (1957)
58. Uredo bidenticida Speg. (1925)
59. Uredo biporula Arthur (1919)
60. Uredo blechnicola Henn. (1904)
61. Uredo bomanii J.C. Lindq. (1968)
62. Uredo bomfimensis Henn. (1904)
63. Uredo bosquieae Vienn.-Bourg. (1952)
64. Uredo bossiaeae McAlpine (1906)
65. Uredo brachylaenae Doidge (1927)
66. Uredo brachylepidis T.S. Ramakr. & Sundaram (1954)
67. Uredo breventiaca A.L. Guyot & Massenot (1958)
68. Uredo bromi-pauciflori S. Ito (1909)
69. Uredo brownii Syd. & P. Syd. (1907)
70. Uredo buchenaviae F. Kern & Whetzel (1926)
71. Uredo bullula F. Kern (1928)
72. Uredo byttneriae Vienn.-Bourg. (1963)
73. Uredo cabreriana F. Kern & Kellerm. (1907)
74. Uredo cajani Syd. & P. Syd. (1906)
75. Uredo calatheae Berndt & F.O. Freire (2004)
76. Uredo caleae Mayor (1914)
77. Uredo calotropidis Cummins (1952)
78. Uredo campeliae F. Kern & Whetzel (1926)
79. Uredo campeliae Syd. (1926)
80. Uredo canavaliae Henn. (1908)
81. Uredo cannae-coccineae J.M. Yen (1970)
82. Uredo cantonensis H.S. Yates (1917)
83. Uredo capilli-veneris Jørst. & S.H. Iqbal (1967)
84. Uredo cardiopteridis J.Y. Zhuang & S.X. Wei (2016)
85. Uredo caricicola Petch (1922)
86. Uredo caricis-confertae Gjaerum (1984)
87. Uredo caricis-petitianae Doidge (1939)
88. Uredo caricis-phalaroidis Speg. (1925)
89. Uredo caricis-rhodesiacae Gjaerum (1999)
90. Uredo caricis-thouarsii Jørst. (1947)
91. Uredo caricis-zuluensis Gjaerum (1999)
92. Uredo carissae Thirum. (1950)
93. Uredo carpodini Henn. (1903)
94. Uredo cassiae K.N. Rao (1987)
95. Uredo cassiae-bicapsularis Petch (1922)
96. Uredo cassiae-glaucae Syd. & P. Syd. (1903)
97. Uredo cassiae-occidentalis T.S. Ramakr. (1975)
98. Uredo cassiae-rugosae Thurst. (1940)
99. Uredo cassiae-stipularis Syd. & P. Syd. (1903)
100. Uredo cassiae-surathensis J.M. Yen (1970)
101. Uredo castaneae Henn. (1908)
102. Uredo cavernula Berndt & R.S. Peterson (2007)
103. Uredo celastri Arthur & Cummins (1937)
104. Uredo celastri-paniculatae T.S. Ramakr. & Sundaram (1954)
105. Uredo cenchricola Henn. (1908)
106. Uredo cenchrophila Speg. (1909)
107. Uredo centhratheri Viégas (1945)
108. Uredo centratheri Syd. (1928)
109. Uredo centrosematis Viégas (1945)
110. Uredo cephalanthi Arthur (1902)
111. Uredo cerotelioides H.S. Jacks. & Holw. (1932)
112. Uredo chamaecyparidis-nutkaensi Tubeuf (1914)
113. Uredo chardonii F. Kern (1932)
114. Uredo chassaliae Petch (1909)
115. Uredo chathamica McKenzie (1991)
116. Uredo cheesemanii G. Cunn. (1928)
117. Uredo chevreuliae Speg. (1912)
118. Uredo chiliotrichi Cotton (1915)
119. Uredo chloridis-berroi Speg. (1925)
120. Uredo chloridis-polydactylidis Viégas (1945)
121. Uredo chlorophorae Cummins (1952)
122. Uredo chonemorphae Racib. (1900)
123. Uredo chrysophylli Syd. & P. Syd. (1909)
124. Uredo chrysophyllicola Henn. (1902)
125. Uredo chuckrasiae C. Mohanan (2010)
126. Uredo cinchonae Henn. (1902)
127. Uredo cinnamomi C. Mohanan (2010)
128. Uredo cissicola Cummins (1943)
129. Uredo cissi-pterocladae Hirats. f. (1959)
130. Uredo claoxyli Sacc. (1915)
131. Uredo clavo J.F. Hennen & J.W. McCain (1994)
132. Uredo cleistanthi C. Mohanan (2010)
133. Uredo clerodendricola Henn. (1902)
134. Uredo clerodendrina Vienn.-Bourg. (1958)
135. Uredo clitandrae Henn. (1904)
136. Uredo clusiae Arthur (1917)
137. Uredo colchici-autumnalis A.L. Guyot & Massenot (1958)
138. Uredo coleanthi Har. (1908)
139. Uredo collinae Gjaerum (1988)
140. Uredo coloni Reichert (1921)
141. Uredo colubrinae Cummins (1943)
142. Uredo columbiae Arthur & Cummins (1937)
143. Uredo combreti F. Kern & Thurst. (1944)
144. Uredo condylocarpi H.S. Jacks. & Holw. (1931)
145. Uredo consanguinea Syd. & P. Syd. (1902)
146. Uredo contraria Arthur (1920)
147. Uredo convestita Syd. & P. Syd. (1909)
148. Uredo conyzicola Jørst. (1959)
149. Uredo copelandii Syd. & P. Syd. (1904)
150. Uredo corbiculoides Cummins (1945)
151. Uredo cormiculoides Cummins (1945)
152. Uredo costicola J.M. Yen & Gilles (1971)
153. Uredo crassiperidiata Cummins (1945)
154. Uredo cratoxyli Arthur & Cummins (1937)
155. Uredo crinitae G. Cunn. (1924)
156. Uredo crotalariae-vitellinae Rangel (1917)
157. Uredo crotalariicola Henn. (1903)
158. Uredo crusa J.F. Hennen & J.W. McCain (1994)
159. Uredo cryptotaeniae Syd. & P. Syd. (1900)
160. Uredo cubangoensis Rangel (1917)
161. Uredo cudraniae Petch (1922)
162. Uredo cumingii J.C. Lindq. (1968)
163. Uredo cundinamarcensis Mayor (1914)
164. Uredo cupheicola H.S. Jacks. & Holw. (1931)
165. Uredo cupressicola R.S. Peterson (1967)
166. Uredo curvata Arthur (1922)
167. Uredo cyathulae Mayor (1914)
168. Uredo cyclanthacearum Berndt (1999)
169. Uredo cyclogena Speg. (1880)
170. Uredo cyclotrauma Speg. (1922)
171. Uredo cydistae (Cummins) A.A. Carvalho & J.F. Hennen (2010)
172. Uredo cymbopogonis-polyneuri Petch (1917)
173. Uredo cynodontis-dactylis F.L. Tai (1947)
174. Uredo cyperi-alopecuroidis Reichert (1921)
175. Uredo cyperi-difformis J.M. Yen (1974)
176. Uredo cyperi-kallii Guyot & Malençon (1957)
177. Uredo cyperi-rotundi S. Ito (1943)
178. Uredo cyperi-stoloniferi J.M. Yen (1970)
179. Uredo cyrtantherae H.S. Jacks. & Holw. (1932)
180. Uredo cyrtococci Z.C. Chen (1980)
181. Uredo cyrtopodii Syd. & P. Syd. (1901)
182. Uredo dalbergiae-dyerianae J.Y. Zhuang & S.X. Wei (2016)
183. Uredo dalbergiae-latifoliae Hosag. & N.C. Nair (1986)
184. Uredo danthoniae Henn. (1902)
185. Uredo daphniphylli Kakish. & Tak. Kobay. (1994)
186. Uredo dapsilis Cummins (1941)
187. Uredo davaoensis Syd. & P. Syd. (1906)
188. Uredo dendrocalami Petch (1922)
189. Uredo dendroseridis Jørst. (1957)
190. Uredo derridicola Arthur & Cummins (1937)
191. Uredo deschampsiae-cespitosae Y.C. Wang (1965)
192. Uredo desmodii-heterocarpi Petch (1917)
193. Uredo desmodii-leiocarpi Henn. (1902)
194. Uredo desmodii-parvifolii Petch (1917)
195. Uredo desmodii-ramosissimi Gjaerum (1985)
196. Uredo desmodii-triquetri Petch (1917)
197. Uredo detecta Mains (1939)
198. Uredo detenta Mains (1939)
199. Uredo deutziicola Hirats. (1938)
200. Uredo dianthicola Har. (1900)
201. Uredo dieteliana Sacc. & P. Syd. (1899)
202. Uredo digitariae-ciliaris Mayor (1915)
203. Uredo digitariae-violascentis Z.C. Chen (1980)
204. Uredo diocleae Cummins (1945)
205. Uredo diocleicola F. Kern & Thurst. (1954)
206. Uredo dioscoreae-alatae Racib. (1900)
207. Uredo dioscoreae-doryphorae J.R. Hern. & E.T. Cline (2010)
208. Uredo dioscoreae-filiformis Racib. (1900)
209. Uredo dioscoreae-pentaphyllae Petch (1912)
210. Uredo dioscoreae-pyrifoliae J.M. Yen (1970)
211. Uredo dioscoreae-quinquelobae Henn. (1903)
212. Uredo dioscoreae-sativae Syd. & P. Syd. (1912)
213. Uredo dioscoreicola F. Kern, Cif. & Thurst. (1933)
214. Uredo diospyri C. Mohanan (2010)
215. Uredo diplostephii F. Kern & Thurst. (1954)
216. Uredo diplostephiicola Berndt (2004)
217. Uredo disae Van der Byl (1927)
218. Uredo dissotidis-longicaudatae Henn. (1903)
219. Uredo dodonaeae Koord. (1907)
220. Uredo dombeyae Doidge (1948)
221. Uredo dombeyicola Cummins (1960)
222. Uredo dovyalidis E. Castell. (1942)
223. Uredo dregiae Petch (1909)
224. Uredo dumeticola (P.E. Crane) J.Y. Zhuang & S.X. Wei (2016)
225. Uredo ebeni Pantidou & D.M. Hend. (1977)
226. Uredo echinosperma Speg. (1922)
227. Uredo ehrhartae-calycinae Doidge (1948)
228. Uredo eichhorniae Gonz. Frag. & Cif. (1927)
229. Uredo eleocharidis-variegatae Gjaerum (2003)
230. Uredo elettariae Thirum. (1943)
231. Uredo elymandrae Gjaerum (1988)
232. Uredo elymi-capitis-medusae Gonz. Frag. (1913)
233. Uredo emendata H.S. Jacks. & Holw. (1931)
234. Uredo emiliae-scabrae T.S. Ramakr. & Sundaram (1954)
235. Uredo emiliae-zeylanicae Petch (1917)
236. Uredo enceliae-tomentosae Maire (1900)
237. Uredo entandrophragmae Cummins (1943)
238. Uredo epidendri Henn. (1896)
239. Uredo eragrostidiphila Gjaerum (1988)
240. Uredo eragrostidis-capensis Gjaerum (1988)
241. Uredo erigerontis Arthur & Cummins (1937)
242. Uredo eriochloana Sacc. & Trotter (1912)
243. Uredo eriosemae H.S. Jacks. & Holw. (1931)
244. Uredo erythrinae Henn. (1908)
245. Uredo eulaliae-fulvae Cummins (1943)
246. Uredo eulophiae Eboh (1986)
247. Uredo eupatoriorum Mayor (1914)
248. Uredo euphorbiae-prunifoliae Reichert (1921)
249. Uredo excipulata Syd. & P. Syd. (1904)
250. Uredo fagarae Syd. & P. Syd. (1914)
251. Uredo fallaciosa Arthur (1915)
252. Uredo famelica Arthur & Cummins (1939)
253. Uredo fatiscens Arthur (1915)
254. Uredo festiva (Syd.) A.A. Carvalho & J.F. Hennen (2010)
255. Uredo festucae-halleri Cruchet (1917)
256. Uredo festucae-ovinae Erikss. (1923)
257. Uredo festucae-parviglumae Z.C. Chen (1980)
258. Uredo fici-chrysocarpae J.M. Yen (1970)
259. Uredo fleuryae Cummins (1960)
260. Uredo floridana Syd. & P. Syd. (1901)
261. Uredo floscopae Henn. (1904)
262. Uredo forsterae G. Cunn. (1924)
263. Uredo fragosoana Caball. (1920)
264. Uredo fragrantissimae Z. Urb. (1967)
265. Uredo freycinetiae Racib. (1900)
266. Uredo fuirenae-strictae Gjaerum (1984)
267. Uredo fulvella Speg. (1922)
268. Uredo fynbosense Berndt (2009)
269. Uredo gaeumannii E. Fisch. (1937)
270. Uredo garcilassae Henn. (1904)
271. Uredo gardeniicola Kakish. & Tak. Kobay. (1994)
272. Uredo garugae Sundaram (1962)
273. Uredo gaudichaudii Syd. & P. Syd. (1903)
274. Uredo gayanae J.C. Lindq. (1964)
275. Uredo gei-aleppici J.Y. Zhuang & S.X. Wei (2018)
276. Uredo gemmata Pat. & Har. (1905)
277. Uredo geniculata Cummins (1937)
278. Uredo geophiliana J.M. Yen & Gilles (1976)
279. Uredo geophilicola Henn. (1904)
280. Uredo geranii-nepalensis Hirats. f. & Hashioka (1935)
281. Uredo gharsei Sathe & Rahalkar (1977)
282. Uredo gladioli-buettneri Bubák (1911)
283. Uredo globulosa Arthur (1916)
284. Uredo glyceriae-distantis Erikss. (1923)
285. Uredo goeldiana Henn. (1903)
286. Uredo grayiae Arthur (1907)
287. Uredo grootboschensis Gjaerum (1999)
288. Uredo guacae Mayor (1914)
289. Uredo guaynabensis F. Kern & Whetzel (1926)
290. Uredo guerichiani Mennicken, W. Maier, Crous & Oberw. (2005)
291. Uredo guettardae Hirats. f. & Hashioka (1935)
292. Uredo guizotiae Henn. (1907)
293. Uredo gynoxidis H.S. Jacks. & Holw. (1932)
294. Uredo gynurae Petch (1912)
295. Uredo haitiensis Jørst. (1959)
296. Uredo hameliae Arthur (1916)
297. Uredo hammarii Henn. (1902)
298. Uredo haplopappi Jørst. (1956)
299. Uredo harunganae Vienn.-Bourg. (1959)
300. Uredo haumata G. Cunn. (1928)
301. Uredo hawaiiensis Arthur (1925)
302. Uredo helini Syd. & P. Syd. (1902)
303. Uredo hemidesmi Syd. & P. Syd. (1912)
304. Uredo henningsii Sacc. & D. Sacc. (1905)
305. Uredo herneriae Torrend (1913)
306. Uredo herteri Syd. & P. Syd. (1914)
307. Uredo hibisci Syd. & P. Syd. (1901)
308. Uredo hidalgensis Cummins (1965)
309. Uredo hieronymi Speg. (1881)
310. Uredo hieronymi Speg. (1912)
311. Uredo hiulca Cummins (1941)
312. Uredo holboelliicola J.Y. Zhuang (1986)
313. Uredo holigarnae C. Mohanan (2010)
314. Uredo holopteleae C. Mohanan (2010)
315. Uredo homeriae Bubák (1911)
316. Uredo horikawae Morim. (1953)
317. Uredo horopito G. Cunn. (1945)
318. Uredo hoveniae J.C. Lindq. & Da Costa Neto (1968)
319. Uredo huallagensis Henn. (1904)
320. Uredo humbertii Maire (1934)
321. Uredo hyalina Dietel (1903)
322. Uredo hygrophilae Syd. & P. Syd. (1906)
323. Uredo hygrophilicola G.F. Laundon & Ponnappa (1966)
324. Uredo hyperici-hookeriani Thaung (1976)
325. Uredo hyperici-humifusi Kleb. (1914)
326. Uredo hyperici-japonici Petch (1922)
327. Uredo hyperici-leucoptychodis Doidge (1939)
328. Uredo hyperici-mysorensis Petch (1917)
329. Uredo hypoestis-verticillaris Gjaerum (1986)
330. Uredo hypoxidis (Bres.) Henn. (1901)
331. Uredo hyptidis-atrorubentis Mayor (1914)
332. Uredo ierensis W.T. Dale (1955)
333. Uredo imperspicua Speg. (1925)
334. Uredo indigoferae Doidge (1927)
335. Uredo induta Syd. (1931)
336. Uredo inquirenda Arthur (1907)
337. Uredo insignis J.C. Lindq. (1955)
338. Uredo inulae-candidae Trotter (1905)
339. Uredo ipomoeicola J.C. Lindq. (1966)
340. Uredo iridis-ruthenicae Y.C. Wang & B. Li (1983)
341. Uredo iriomotensis Hirats. f. & S. Kaneko (1975)
342. Uredo irrequisita H.S. Jacks. & Holw. (1932)
343. Uredo isachnes Syd. & P. Syd. (1906)
344. Uredo ischaemi Syd., P. Syd. & E.J. Butler (1907)
345. Uredo ischaemi-ciliaris Petch (1912)
346. Uredo ischaemi-commutati Petch (1912)
347. Uredo ischnosiphonis Henn. (1904)
348. Uredo isoglossae Gjaerum (1986)
349. Uredo iwatensis Dietel (1905)
350. Uredo iyoensis Hirats. f. & Yoshin. (1935)
351. Uredo jaranae F.C. Albuq. (1971)
352. Uredo jasoniae Henn. (1902)
353. Uredo jeffersii Cummins (1952)
354. Uredo jozankensis S. Ito (1909)
355. Uredo jucunda Syd. (1925)
356. Uredo juelii J. Walker (1983)
357. Uredo junci-dregeani Gjaerum (1990)
358. Uredo junci-engleri Gjaerum (1990)
359. Uredo junci-glauci Tranzschel (1939)
360. Uredo kabaleensis Gjaerum (1983)
361. Uredo kabanyoloensis Gjaerum (1984)
362. Uredo kaempferiae Syd. & P. Syd. (1914)
363. Uredo karetu G. Cunn. (1924)
364. Uredo keissleri J.C. Lindq. (1968)
365. Uredo kentaniensis Gjaerum (1999)
366. Uredo kerguelensis Henn. (1906)
367. Uredo khandalensis Sathe & Rahalkar (1976)
368. Uredo kigeziensis Cummins (1943)
369. Uredo kriegeriana Syd. & P. Syd. (1902)
370. Uredo kyllingae-brevifoliae Dietel (1905)
371. Uredo kyllingae-erectae J.M. Yen (1973)
372. Uredo kyllingae-peruvianae J.M. Yen (1973)
373. Uredo labatiae Speg. (1925)
374. Uredo laeticolor Arthur (1920)
375. Uredo lafoenseae H.S. Jacks. & Holw. (1931)
376. Uredo lagerstroemiae J.Y. Zhuang & S.X. Wei (2011)
377. Uredo laggerae Syd. & P. Syd. (1914)
378. Uredo lamarckiae Kleb. (1914)
379. Uredo lanneae-coromandelicae P.B. Chavan & Bakare (1973)
380. Uredo laporteae Hirats. f. (1952)
381. Uredo lasianthi Syd. (1931)
382. Uredo lathyri-hygrophili Gjaerum (2003)
383. Uredo leersiae Gjaerum (1988)
384. Uredo leioderma Speg. (1922)
385. Uredo leliefontinensis Mennicken, W. Maier, Crous & Oberw. (2005)
386. Uredo leonuri Speg. (1912)
387. Uredo leucadicola Gjaerum (1986)
388. Uredo leucaenae-glaucae Hirats. f. & Hashioka (1935)
389. Uredo ligulariae-lamarum J.Y. Zhuang & S.X. Wei (2012)
390. Uredo lindackeriae Vienn.-Bourg. (1955)
391. Uredo lindsaeae-japonicae Hirats. f. & S. Uchida (1967)
392. Uredo lipocarphae Syd. & P. Syd. (1907)
393. Uredo lippiae Dietel & Holw. (1901)
394. Uredo longaensis Henn. (1903)
395. Uredo longan J.Y. Zhuang, J.F. Ling & B. Xu (2021)
396. Uredo longozyi Bouriquet & Bassino (1966)
397. Uredo lophatheri Petch (1922)
398. Uredo lotononi Doidge (1927)
399. Uredo lueheae Speg. (1912)
400. Uredo lupulinae Speg. (1912)
401. Uredo lutea Arthur (1915)
402. Uredo luzulae-effusae Hirats. (1938)
403. Uredo lycoseridis F. Kern & Thurst. (1943)
404. Uredo maceiensis Henn. (1904)
405. Uredo macella H.S. Jacks. & Holw. (1926)
406. Uredo machaeriicola Cummins (1943)
407. Uredo malabarica T.S. Ramakr. & K. Ramakr. (1949)
408. Uredo manilensis Syd. & P. Syd. (1910)
409. Uredo mannanurensis K.N. Rao (1987)
410. Uredo marantaceae Henn. (1907)
411. Uredo mararyensis Henn. (1904)
412. Uredo marchionatii Speg. (1925)
413. Uredo marginoincrassata Henn. (1902)
414. Uredo marisci Petch (1922)
415. Uredo marisci-trialati J.Y. Zhuang & S.X. Wei (2016)
416. Uredo marmoxaiae Speg. (1914)
417. Uredo martynii W.T. Dale (1955)
418. Uredo masatierra J.C. Lindq. (1972)
419. Uredo maschalocephali Cummins (1952)
420. Uredo massalongoana Sacc. (1918)
421. Uredo maua D.E. Gardner & Flynn (1998)
422. Uredo mauriae Syd. (1925)
423. Uredo mckinleyensis Cummins (1952)
424. Uredo medellinensis Pardo-Card. (2000)
425. Uredo medicaginis Speg. (1902)
426. Uredo mediterranea Lindr. (1901)
427. Uredo megalospora Speg. (1909)
428. Uredo melinidis F. Kern (1938)
429. Uredo meliosmae Petch (1922)
430. Uredo meridae F. Kern, Thurst. & Whetzel (1934)
431. Uredo merremiae Berndt (1999)
432. Uredo mexicensis Cummins (1977)
433. Uredo microglossae Petch (1912)
434. Uredo microstegii Z.C. Chen (1980)
435. Uredo millettiae Sawada (1931)
436. Uredo mimica Cummins (1940)
437. Uredo mimosae-invisae Viégas (1945)
438. Uredo mira Cummins (1943)
439. Uredo mirtinis González-Ceballos, Salazar-Yepes & Buriticá (2019)
440. Uredo miscanthi-floriduli Z.C. Chen (1980)
441. Uredo miscanthi-sinensis Sawada (1943)
442. Uredo miscanthi-sinensis Sawada ex Hirats. f. (1959)
443. Uredo mkusiensis Henn. (1904)
444. Uredo mogy-mirim Viégas (1945)
445. Uredo momordicae Petch (1917)
446. Uredo monactidis H.S. Jacks. & Holw. (1932)
447. Uredo monechmatis Cummins (1952)
448. Uredo monninae J.C. Lindq. (1951)
449. Uredo monochaeti F. Kern & Thurst. (1944)
450. Uredo monsterae Syd. (1930)
451. Uredo monstericola F. Kern, Thurst. & Whetzel (1934)
452. Uredo montis-elgonensis Gjaerum (1984)
453. Uredo moraceae Henn. (1908)
454. Uredo moricola Henn. (1902)
455. Uredo morifolia Sawada (1919)
456. Uredo morindae Morim. (1956)
457. Uredo morobeana Cummins (1943)
458. Uredo morobensis Cummins (1940)
459. Uredo morvernensis Dennis (1983)
460. Uredo moschatus G. Cunn. (1928)
461. Uredo mucunae Henn. (1907)
462. Uredo muehlenbeckiae H.S. Jacks. & Holw. (1927)
463. Uredo mundkurii P.B. Chavan (1975)
464. Uredo musae Cummins (1941)
465. Uredo musicola J.M. Yen (1974)
466. Uredo myopori Cummins (1952)
467. Uredo myrciae Mayor (1914)
468. Uredo myriactidis Sundaram (1962)
469. Uredo myricae Berndt (2020)
470. Uredo nakanishikii Henn. (1905)
471. Uredo nampoinae Bouriquet & Bassino (1966)
472. Uredo nankaiensis S. Uchida (1964)
473. Uredo nanpingensis B. Li (1987)
474. Uredo nassellae H.C. Greene & Cummins (1958)
475. Uredo nectandrae Viégas (1945)
476. Uredo neilgherriensis T.S. Ramakr. (1950)
477. Uredo neocomensis Mayor (1923)
478. Uredo neopustulata Cummins (1956)
479. Uredo nephrolepidis Dietel (1914)
480. Uredo nervicola Tranzschel (1907)
481. Uredo nerviseda Syd. & P. Syd. (1913)
482. Uredo neurolepidis Pardo-Card. (2000)
483. Uredo newbouldiae Vienn.-Bourg. (1952)
484. Uredo newtoniae Gjaerum & D.A. Reid (1987)
485. Uredo ngamboensis Henn. (1904)
486. Uredo nicotianae Arthur (1904)
487. Uredo nidulans Syd. & P. Syd. (1903)
488. Uredo nigropuncta Henn. (1896)
489. Uredo nitidula Arthur (1920)
490. Uredo nociviola H.S. Jacks. & Holw. (1926)
491. Uredo nominata Arthur (1922)
492. Uredo novae-zelandiae G.F. Laundon (1963)
493. Uredo obnixa Cummins (1943)
494. Uredo ocfemiana F. Stevens (1931)
495. Uredo ochlandrae Petch (1912)
496. Uredo ochnae K.N. Rao (1987)
497. Uredo oenothericola Speg. (1909)
498. Uredo ogaoensis Cummins (1941)
499. Uredo oleariae Cooke (1890)
500. Uredo olyrae Henn. (1904)
501. Uredo operta Syd., P. Syd. & E.J. Butler (1907)
502. Uredo ophiorrhizae Petch (1917)
503. Uredo ophiuri Syd., P. Syd. & E.J. Butler (1906)
504. Uredo oplismeni-undulatifolii Z.C. Chen (1980)
505. Uredo orientalis Racib. (1909)
506. Uredo ornithidii F. Kern, Cif. & Thurst. (1933)
507. Uredo oryzopsidis Gonz. Frag. (1926)
508. Uredo otholobii Berndt, A.R. Wood & E. Uhlmann (2006)
509. Uredo othonnae Jørst. (1957)
510. Uredo otoskegiae S. Ahmad (1956)
511. Uredo otostegiae S. Ahmad (1956)
512. Uredo pacensis J.C. Lindq. (1957)
513. Uredo paederiae Syd. & P. Syd. (1902)
514. Uredo palicoureae Henn. (1904)
515. Uredo pallatangae Jørst. (1956)
516. Uredo pallidiuscula Speg. (1908)
517. Uredo palmifoliae Cummins (1941)
518. Uredo palpigera Cummins (1945)
519. Uredo panacis Syd. & P. Syd. (1903)
520. Uredo panici Arthur (1902)
521. Uredo panici-maximi Rangel (1917)
522. Uredo panici-montani Petch (1917)
523. Uredo panici-monticolae Gjaerum (2003)
524. Uredo panici-plicati Sawada (1943)
525. Uredo panici-prostrati Syd. & P. Syd. (1906)
526. Uredo panici-villosi Petch (1922)
527. Uredo panicophila Speg. (1926)
528. Uredo paranaensis Penn. (1902)
529. Uredo paronychiae H.S. Jacks. (1924)
530. Uredo pasochoae Berndt (1996)
531. Uredo paspali Pandotra (1966)
532. Uredo paspali-longiflori Petch (1917)
533. Uredo paspali-perrottetii Petch (1917)
534. Uredo paspaliphila Gjaerum (2003)
535. Uredo paspali-scrobiculati Syd. & P. Syd. (1906)
536. Uredo paspali-scrobiculatiana J.M. Yen (1973)
537. Uredo passiflorae Cummins (1941)
538. Uredo paulensis Henn. (1902)
539. Uredo paulistana Speg. (1908)
540. Uredo peckoltiae Syd. & P. Syd. (1903)
541. Uredo pedicellata Racib. (1909)
542. Uredo pehriae F. Kern & Thurst. (1944)
543. Uredo pergulariae Cummins (1945)
544. Uredo peridiata Arthur & Cummins (1936)
545. Uredo perscita Cummins (1945)
546. Uredo persicae Speg. (1908)
547. Uredo petelotii Pat. (1923)
548. Uredo philippinensis Syd. & P. Syd. (1906)
549. Uredo philodendri Pardo-Card. (2003)
550. Uredo phoradendri H.S. Jacks. (1918)
551. Uredo phormii G. Cunn. (1924)
552. Uredo photiniae J.M. Yen (1976)
553. Uredo phylicae Vienn.-Bourg. (1970)
554. Uredo phyllanthi-longifolii Petch (1917)
555. Uredo phyllanthi-niruris M.S. Patil (1992)
556. Uredo phyllanthi-reticulati Petch (1922)
557. Uredo pinardiae Unamuno (1923)
558. Uredo piptanthus M.M. Chen (1982)
559. Uredo plantaginis-mediae Gonz. Frag. (1914)
560. Uredo pleurothallidis Keissl. (1918)
561. Uredo pogonarthriae Syd. & P. Syd. (1912)
562. Uredo polliae Cummins (1941)
563. Uredo polygalae Kalchbr. (1882)
564. Uredo polygalicola Hirats. f. (1942)
565. Uredo polygoni-runcinati J.Y. Zhuang (1986)
566. Uredo polylepidis (Arthur) Sacc. & Trotter (1925)
567. Uredo polytaenii F. Kern, Cif. & Thurst. (1933)
568. Uredo portoricensis Roure (1963)
569. Uredo posita Davis ex Arthur (1934)
570. Uredo pouzolziae Syd. & P. Syd. (1906)
571. Uredo premnae Koord. (1907)
572. Uredo pretoriensis Syd. & P. Syd. (1912)
573. Uredo prodigiosa Y.C. Wang & J.Y. Zhuang (1983)
574. Uredo prosopidicola Speg. (1912)
575. Uredo pruni-maximowiczii Henn. (1902)
576. Uredo pseudocannae Cummins (1941)
577. Uredo pseudocystopteridis Y.Z. Wang & S.X. Wei (1980)
578. Uredo psoraleae-polystictae Doidge (1941)
579. Uredo psorospermi Vienn.-Bourg. (1959)
580. Uredo pteridis-creticae J.Y. Zhuang & S.X. Wei (2018)
581. Uredo pterocarpi T.S. Ramakr. (1956)
582. Uredo pterygospora J.Y. Zhuang (1986)
583. Uredo puawhananga G.T.S. Baylis (1954)
584. Uredo pusilla F. Kern, Thurst. & Whetzel (1934)
585. Uredo puttemansii Henn. (1902)
586. Uredo pycreicola J.M. Yen & Gilles (1976)
587. Uredo quercus-myrsinifoliae Henn. (1905)
588. Uredo quichensis Cummins (1943)
589. Uredo quinqueporula Arthur & Fromme (1915)
590. Uredo quitensis H.S. Jacks. & Holw. (1932)
591. Uredo raciborskiana Sacc. & Trotter (1912)
592. Uredo raciborskii Sacc. & P. Syd. (1902)
593. Uredo raciborskii Koord. (1907)
594. Uredo ramonensis Syd. (1925)
595. Uredo rangelii J.A. Simpson, K. Thomas & Grgur. 2006
596. Uredo ranunculacearum DC. (1815)
597. Uredo ranunculi-sulphurei Jørst. (1962)
598. Uredo ravennae Maire (1917)
599. Uredo reaumuriicola Henn. (1900)
600. Uredo recondita Speg. (1918)
601. Uredo rectangulata F.C. Albuq. (1971)
602. Uredo reicheana Arthur (1924)
603. Uredo reissekiae Syd. & P. Syd. (1907)
604. Uredo retalhuleuensis Z. Urb. (1973)
605. Uredo rhaphidophorae Sacc. (1919)
606. Uredo rhei-undulati Dietel (1906)
607. Uredo rhinacanthi T.S. Ramakr. & Sundaram (1954)
608. Uredo rhoina Syd. & P. Syd. (1914)
609. Uredo rhynchosporae Henn. (1907)
610. Uredo robinsoniae Keissl. (1927)
611. Uredo rochaei Puttemans (1906)
612. Uredo rondeletiae Arthur & Holw. (1918)
613. Uredo rottboelliae Dietel (1902)
614. Uredo roupalae Cummins (1937)
615. Uredo rousseliae F. Kern & Whetzel (1926)
616. Uredo rubescens Arthur (1915)
617. Uredo ruhlandii Henn. (1899)
618. Uredo sabiceicola Arthur (1915)
619. Uredo sagamiensis Hirats. f. & S. Uchida (1964)
620. Uredo salicis-acmophyllae Gonz. Frag. (1916)
621. Uredo salviarum Mayor (1914)
622. Uredo santa-rosensis Berndt (1996)
623. Uredo saphena Arthur & Cummins (1933)
624. Uredo sapotae Arthur & J.R. Johnst. (1918)
625. Uredo sarcocollae Mennicken, Berndt & Oberw. (2003)
626. Uredo satyrii Massee (1908)
627. Uredo sauvagesiae Arthur (1916)
628. Uredo saviae Arthur & J.R. Johnst. (1918)
629. Uredo sawadae S. Ito (1943)
630. Uredo scalesiae Bonar (1939)
631. Uredo scarabaeoidis Bouriquet & Bassino (1966)
632. Uredo schelhammerae McAlpine (1906)
633. Uredo schizachyrii Doidge (1939)
634. Uredo schizolobii Berndt & F.O. Freire (2004)
635. Uredo scirpi Castagne (1845)
636. Uredo scirpi-corymbosi Doidge (1939)
637. Uredo scirpi-maritimi Doidge (1941)
638. Uredo scirpi-nodosi McAlpine (1906)
639. Uredo sclerochloae Har. (1908)
640. Uredo scolopiae Syd. & P. Syd. (1914)
641. Uredo scopigena Henn. (1904)
642. Uredo seclusa H.S. Jacks. & Holw. (1931)
643. Uredo sekhukhunenensis Berndt & A.R. Wood (2012)
644. Uredo semidiscifera Berndt (1999)
645. Uredo senecionicola H.S. Jacks. & Holw. (1932)
646. Uredo sesbaniae Henn. (1907)
647. Uredo setariae Speg. (1912)
648. Uredo setariae-excurrentis Y.C. Wang (1965)
649. Uredo setariae-italicae Dietel (1903)
650. Uredo setariae-onuri Dietel (1937)
651. Uredo setariae-tomentosae Ramachar, Bhagyan. & A. Kumar (1978)
652. Uredo shuteriae T.S. Ramakr. (1950)
653. Uredo sibthorpiae J.C. Lindq. (1960)
654. Uredo sinuatitunicata Berndt (2002)
655. Uredo sissoo Syd., P. Syd. & E.J. Butler (1906)
656. Uredo sleumeri J.C. Lindq. (1952)
657. Uredo socotrae Syd. & P. Syd. (1903)
658. Uredo sopubiae Petch (1917)
659. Uredo sparganophori Henn. (1904)
660. Uredo spartinae-strictae Pat. & Har. (1905)
661. Uredo speschnewii Sacc. & P. Syd. (1902)
662. Uredo sporoboli-pyramidalidis Gjaerum (1983)
663. Uredo spyridii Cooke & Massee (1887)
664. Uredo stachyuri Dietel (1905)
665. Uredo standleyi Z. Urb. (1973)
666. Uredo stenochlaenae Cummins (1952)
667. Uredo stevensiana Arthur (1915)
668. Uredo stevensii Arthur (1925)
669. Uredo stipae-laxiflorae Y.C. Wang (1965)
670. Uredo strychni Henn. (1907)
671. Uredo stryphnodendri Berndt & F.O. Freire (2002)
672. Uredo subnigra Arthur & Cummins (1937)
673. Uredo subsolana Cummins (1941)
674. Uredo sumatrensis Jørst. (1959)
675. Uredo sumireicola Morim. (1960)
676. Uredo susica Maire (1937)
677. Uredo suspecta H.S. Jacks. & Holw. (1918)
678. Uredo symbolanthi Henn. (1904)
679. Uredo syntherismae Speg. (1922)
680. Uredo synuri Azbukina (1972)
681. Uredo tacita Arthur (1933)
682. Uredo tainiae Hirats. (1938)
683. Uredo taiwaniana Hirats. f. & Hashioka (1934)
684. Uredo tanaceti {{{1}}}
685. Uredo tanzaniae Cummins (1971)
686. Uredo tarchonanthi Mennicken & Oberw. (2004)
687. Uredo tarchunii Teterevn.-Babajan (1948)
688. Uredo temucensis H.S. Jacks. & Holw. (1932)
689. Uredo tenebrosa H.S. Jacks. & Holw. (1926)
690. Uredo tephrosiae Rabenh. (1878)
691. Uredo teramni Mayor (1914)
692. Uredo teramnicola Arthur & Cummins (1937)
693. Uredo terminaliae-paniculatae T.S. Ramakr. & K. Ramakr. (1949)
694. Uredo terminaliae-paniculati T.S. Ramakr. (1949)
695. Uredo tesoensis Wakef. (1949)
696. Uredo thalictri-glauci Gonz. Frag. (1918)
697. Uredo thelypteridis Yadav (1964)
698. Uredo themedae Dietel (1908)
699. Uredo themedicola Cummins (1941)
700. Uredo theresiae Neger (1902)
701. Uredo thermopsidicola Hirats. f. (1954)
702. Uredo tholopsora Cummins (1951)
703. Uredo thuemenii Bagyan. & Ramachar (1984)
704. Uredo tijucae H.S. Jacks. & Holw. (1931)
705. Uredo tillandsiae Cummins (1960)
706. Uredo toetoe G. Cunn. (1924)
707. Uredo tolimensis F. Kern & Whetzel (1930)
708. Uredo toroiana F. Kern (1928)
709. Uredo torulinii Henn. (1905)
710. Uredo tournefortiae H.S. Jacks. & Holw. (1931)
711. Uredo trabutii Pat. (1901)
712. Uredo trachyphrynii Vienn.-Bourg. (1955)
713. Uredo tribulis Cummins (1937)
714. Uredo trichiliae Arthur (1917)
715. Uredo trichomoides Cummins (1960)
716. Uredo trichopterygis-dregeanae Gjaerum (1988)
717. Uredo trigoniae Mains (1939)
718. Uredo tuitei J.F. Hennen & J.W. McCain (1994)
719. Uredo tupare G. Cunn. (1924)
720. Uredo uncinata F. Kern, Cif. & Thurst. (1933)
721. Uredo unciniicola Cummins (1941)
722. Uredo valentula H.S. Jacks. & Holw. (1931)
723. Uredo varthemiae Rayss (1937)
724. Uredo verbesinicola H.S. Jacks. & Holw. (1932)
725. Uredo verecunda Syd. (1935)
726. Uredo vernoniae Henn. (1908)
727. Uredo vernoniae-hookerianae Petch (1917)
728. Uredo vernoniae-thomsonianae J.M. Yen (1972)
729. Uredo vernoniicola Petch (1917)
730. Uredo verruculosa Berndt (1998)
731. Uredo vetus J.F. Hennen (1997)
732. Uredo vicatiae Syd. & P. Syd. (1907)
733. Uredo vicina Arthur (1915)
734. Uredo vicosiana Thurst. (1940)
735. Uredo victoriae Cummins (1971)
736. Uredo viegasii Jørst. (1959)
737. Uredo viticis-polygamae Henn. (1902)
738. Uredo vittariae S. Uchida (1964)
739. Uredo vulcani D.E. Gardner (1988)
740. Uredo wakensis Cummins (1940)
741. Uredo wantoatensis Cummins (1941)
742. Uredo wharanui G. Cunn. (1924)
743. Uredo wilsonii Arthur (1910)
744. Uredo wittmackiana Henn. & Klitzing (1904)
745. Uredo xenoporula P. Syd. & Syd. (1924)
746. Uredo xyliae C. Mohanan (2010)
747. Uredo xyridis Mains (1939)
748. Uredo yakushimensis Morim. (1953)
749. Uredo yoshinagae Dietel (1905)
750. Uredo yucatanensis Mains (1939)
751. Uredo yuwandakensis Morim. (1956)
752. Uredo zarumae H.S. Jacks. & Holw. (1931)
753. Uredo zeugites Arthur & Holw. (1918)
754. Uredo zilleri Bagyan. & Ramachar (1984)
755. Uredo zollikoferiae Pat. (1909)

Note:

- Uredo behnickiana Henn. (1905), is now Desmosorus oncidii (Pucciniales incertae sedis)
- Uredo rangelii J.A. Simpson, K. Thomas & Grgur. (2006) may now be Austropuccinia psidii
