= Diplodia paraphysaria =

Scientific classification
- Kingdom: Fungi
- Division: Ascomycota
- Class: Dothideomycetes
- Order: Botryosphaeriales
- Family: Botryosphaeriaceae
- Genus: Diplodia
- Species: D. paraphysaria

Binomial name
- Diplodia paraphysaria Sacc., (1896)

Species of fungus

Diplodia paraphysaria is a fungal plant pathogen.
