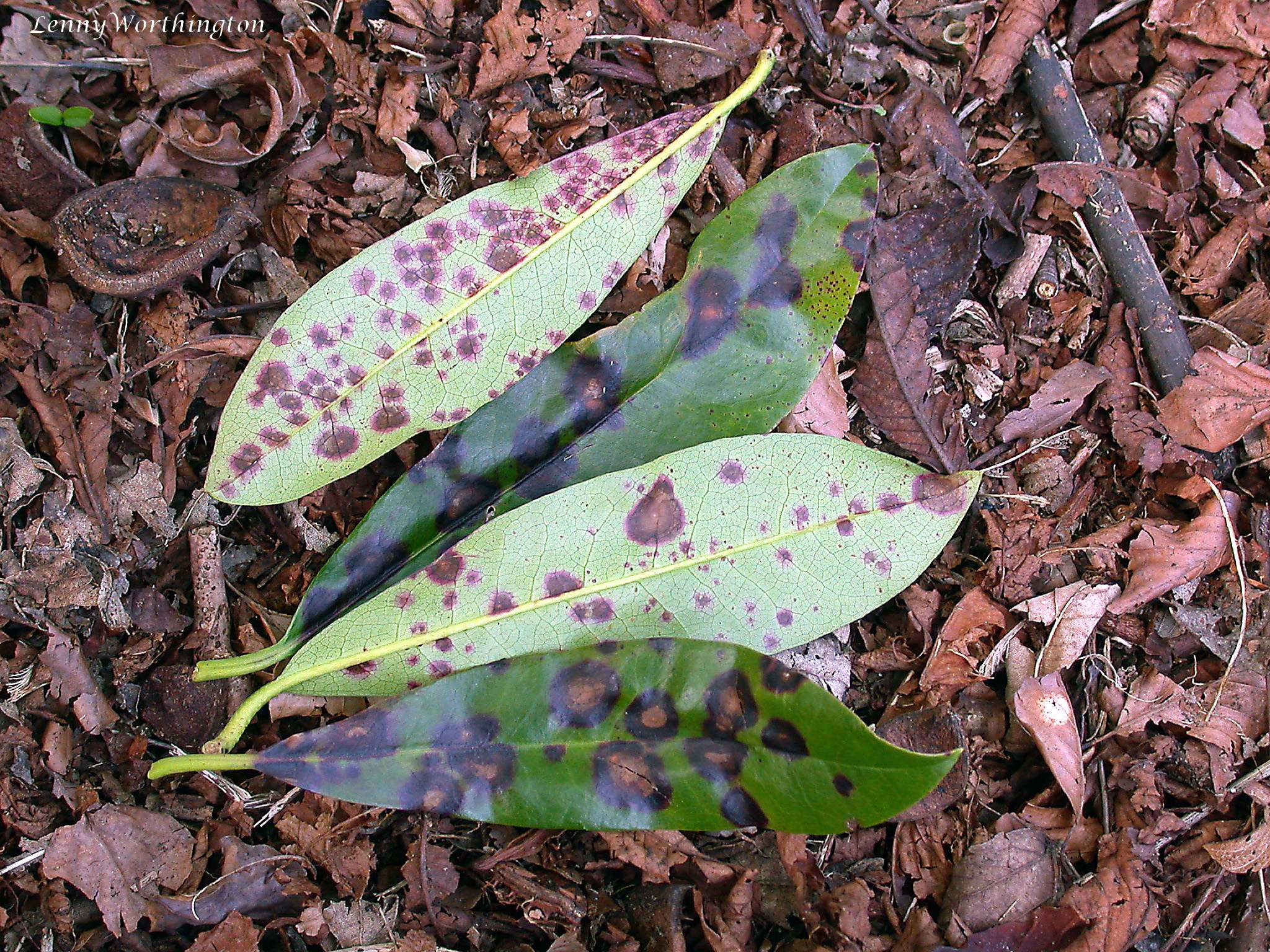
- Gloeosporium rhododendri on Rhododendron ponticum

Scientific classification
- Kingdom: Fungi
- Division: Ascomycota
- Class: Leotiomycetes
- Order: Helotiales
- Family: Dermateaceae
- Genus: Gloeosporium; Desm. & Mont., 1849

= Gloeosporium =

Genus of fungi

Gloeosporium is a genus of fungi belonging to the family Dermateaceae.

The genus has cosmopolitan distribution.

== Species ==
- Gloeosporium acaciae
- Gloeosporium acanthophylli
- Gloeosporium aceris-tataricae
- Gloeosporium aceris-tatarici
- Gloeosporium adenocalymmatis
- Gloeosporium adonidis
- Gloeosporium aecidiicola
- Gloeosporium agatinum
- Gloeosporium agaves
- Gloeosporium aglaonemae
- Gloeosporium ailanthi
- Gloeosporium albiziae
- Gloeosporium alchorneae
- Gloeosporium aleuriticum
- Gloeosporium allescherianum
- Gloeosporium alpinum
- Gloeosporium alstoniae
- Gloeosporium amaranthi
- Gloeosporium amorphae
- Gloeosporium angophorae
- Gloeosporium annonae
- Gloeosporium anthocephali
- Gloeosporium anthuriophilum
- Gloeosporium apiosporium
- Gloeosporium aracearum
- Gloeosporium araliae
- Gloeosporium arctostaphyli
- Gloeosporium aroniae
- Gloeosporium artocarpi
- Gloeosporium asphodeli
- Gloeosporium atraphaxis
- Gloeosporium barringtoniae
- Gloeosporium begoniae
- Gloeosporium beniaminae
- Gloeosporium bergeniae
- Gloeosporium betae
- Gloeosporium betulicola
- Gloeosporium bignoniacearum
- Gloeosporium bischofiae
- Gloeosporium bohemicum
- Gloeosporium bombacis
- Gloeosporium bomplandii
- Gloeosporium bonatii
- Gloeosporium borgianum
- Gloeosporium brosimi
- Gloeosporium brunfelsiae
- Gloeosporium brunneomaculatum
- Gloeosporium bryophylli
- Gloeosporium caballeroi
- Gloeosporium calopogonii
- Gloeosporium camerunense
- Gloeosporium campanulae
- Gloeosporium camphorae
- Gloeosporium canavaliae
- Gloeosporium canistri
- Gloeosporium capreae
- Gloeosporium capsici
- Gloeosporium carissae
- Gloeosporium cassiae-siameae
- Gloeosporium castanopsidis
- Gloeosporium cattleyae
- Gloeosporium cavarae
- Gloeosporium cecidophilum
- Gloeosporium celastri
- Gloeosporium cephaelis
- Gloeosporium cerasi
- Gloeosporium chilense
- Gloeosporium chioneum
- Gloeosporium cistinum
- Gloeosporium citri
- Gloeosporium clausenae
- Gloeosporium cliviae
- Gloeosporium coccolobae
- Gloeosporium cocculi
- Gloeosporium coffeicola
- Gloeosporium coffeigenum
- Gloeosporium colubrinum
- Gloeosporium conviva
- Gloeosporium corni
- Gloeosporium corylinum
- Gloeosporium crataegi
- Gloeosporium crataeginum
- Gloeosporium crotalariae
- Gloeosporium cryptocaryae
- Gloeosporium cryptum
- Gloeosporium curculiginis
- Gloeosporium cylindrospermum
- Gloeosporium cymbidii
- Gloeosporium cypripedii
- Gloeosporium cytharexyli
- Gloeosporium dahliae
- Gloeosporium deformans
- Gloeosporium densiusculum
- Gloeosporium dieffenbachiae
- Gloeosporium divergens
- Gloeosporium duthieanum
- Gloeosporium echitidis
- Gloeosporium egenum
- Gloeosporium elaeocarpi
- Gloeosporium epidendri
- Gloeosporium eragrostidis
- Gloeosporium eriobotryae
- Gloeosporium eucalyptorum
- Gloeosporium euonymi
- Gloeosporium euonymicola
- Gloeosporium fagaricola
- Gloeosporium ferrugineum
- Gloeosporium fici-religiosae
- Gloeosporium frankii
- Gloeosporium fructus-caricae
- Gloeosporium fructus-psidii
- Gloeosporium furfuraceum
- Gloeosporium garciniae
- Gloeosporium gelonii
- Gloeosporium geranii
- Gloeosporium gevuinae
- Gloeosporium ginkgonis
- Gloeosporium gleditschiae
- Gloeosporium glochidii
- Gloeosporium glycosmidis
- Gloeosporium gneti
- Gloeosporium graffii
- Gloeosporium hakeae
- Gloeosporium helosciadii
- Gloeosporium henningsii
- Gloeosporium heterophyllae
- Gloeosporium heteropteridis
- Gloeosporium heveae
- Gloeosporium hibisci-tiliacei
- Gloeosporium hollboelliae
- Gloeosporium holocalicis
- Gloeosporium hoyae
- Gloeosporium hydrophylli
- Gloeosporium hymenocrateris
- Gloeosporium ilicis
- Gloeosporium illicii
- Gloeosporium impatientis
- Gloeosporium inocarpi
- Gloeosporium intumescens
- Gloeosporium jambosae
- Gloeosporium kawakamii
- Gloeosporium kentiae
- Gloeosporium kickxiae
- Gloeosporium kiotoense
- Gloeosporium labes
- Gloeosporium lappae
- Gloeosporium lebbek
- Gloeosporium ligustri
- Gloeosporium linariae-genistifoliae
- Gloeosporium loranthaceae
- Gloeosporium loranthi
- Gloeosporium macrophomoides
- Gloeosporium malpighiae
- Gloeosporium mangostanae
- Gloeosporium marantaceae
- Gloeosporium marginans
- Gloeosporium masdevalliae
- Gloeosporium medinillae
- Gloeosporium megaclinii
- Gloeosporium meliicola
- Gloeosporium melleum
- Gloeosporium merrilii
- Gloeosporium mesopotamicum
- Gloeosporium metasequoiae
- Gloeosporium miltoniae
- Gloeosporium minus
- Gloeosporium mirabilis
- Gloeosporium monsterae
- Gloeosporium morindae
- Gloeosporium mucosum
- Gloeosporium muehlenbeckiae
- Gloeosporium multipunctatum
- Gloeosporium myricae
- Gloeosporium myristicae
- Gloeosporium myristicicola
- Gloeosporium nepenthicola
- Gloeosporium nervicola
- Gloeosporium nicolai
- Gloeosporium niveum
- Gloeosporium nymphaeae
- Gloeosporium obtegens
- Gloeosporium ocellatum
- Gloeosporium odontoglossi
- Gloeosporium oelandicum
- Gloeosporium opacum
- Gloeosporium orbiculare
- Gloeosporium orobi
- Gloeosporium palmigenum
- Gloeosporium pandani
- Gloeosporium papulatum
- Gloeosporium paulense
- Gloeosporium paulistanum
- Gloeosporium pedemontanum
- Gloeosporium penstemonicola
- Gloeosporium perpusillum
- Gloeosporium perseae
- Gloeosporium perseae-drymifoliae
- Gloeosporium pestis
- Gloeosporium petiveriae
- Gloeosporium phacidiellum
- Gloeosporium phaii
- Gloeosporium phillyreinum
- Gloeosporium philodendri
- Gloeosporium phormii
- Gloeosporium phyllachoricola
- Gloeosporium pitcairniae
- Gloeosporium pithecellobii
- Gloeosporium pittospori
- Gloeosporium politis
- Gloeosporium polygonati
- Gloeosporium polygoni
- Gloeosporium polymorphum
- Gloeosporium polypodii
- Gloeosporium polystigmicola
- Gloeosporium populi-nigrae
- Gloeosporium pourretiae
- Gloeosporium pouteriae
- Gloeosporium pseudophoma
- Gloeosporium psoraleae
- Gloeosporium pteleae
- Gloeosporium pteridii
- Gloeosporium pyrostegiae
- Gloeosporium quercuum
- Gloeosporium rhamni
- Gloeosporium rhapontici
- Gloeosporium rhodobolum
- Gloeosporium rhododendricola
- Gloeosporium rhodospermum
- Gloeosporium ricini
- Gloeosporium roaldii
- Gloeosporium robertiani
- Gloeosporium roesteliicola
- Gloeosporium rubellum
- Gloeosporium saccardoi
- Gloeosporium salsum
- Gloeosporium sansevieriae
- Gloeosporium saponariae
- Gloeosporium sarcococcae
- Gloeosporium sarmenticola
- Gloeosporium scorzonerae
- Gloeosporium shiraianum
- Gloeosporium siameae
- Gloeosporium silenicola
- Gloeosporium sisymbrii
- Gloeosporium smilacis
- Gloeosporium sobraliae
- Gloeosporium solani
- Gloeosporium somaliense
- Gloeosporium sordidum
- Gloeosporium speiranthis
- Gloeosporium sphaerosporum
- Gloeosporium stenocarpi
- Gloeosporium subcuticulare
- Gloeosporium suecicum
- Gloeosporium sundari
- Gloeosporium sycophilum
- Gloeosporium thalictri
- Gloeosporium theae
- Gloeosporium thuemenii
- Gloeosporium tremellinum
- Gloeosporium trifolii
- Gloeosporium trifoliorum
- Gloeosporium triviale
- Gloeosporium trotteri
- Gloeosporium urospermi
- Gloeosporium usteri
- Gloeosporium vagans
- Gloeosporium vandopsidis
- Gloeosporium variabilisporum
- Gloeosporium venetum
- Gloeosporium veratri
- Gloeosporium veronicae
- Gloeosporium vogelianum
- Gloeosporium weirianum
- Gloeosporium wendlandiae
- Gloeosporium yuccae
- Gloeosporium zamiae
- Gloeosporium zibethinum
- Gloeosporium zonatum
