= Diplodia seriata =

Scientific classification
- Kingdom: Fungi
- Division: Ascomycota
- Class: Dothideomycetes
- Order: Botryosphaeriales
- Family: Botryosphaeriaceae
- Genus: Diplodia
- Species: D. seriata

Binomial name
- Diplodia seriata De Not. 1842

Species of fungus

Diplodia seriata is an anamorphic fungus species in the genus Diplodia. It is a cause of bot canker of grapevine in Mexico.
