= Uredo musae =

Scientific classification
- Domain: Eukaryota
- Kingdom: Fungi
- Division: Basidiomycota
- Class: Pucciniomycetes
- Order: Pucciniales
- Family: Pucciniaceae
- Genus: Uredo
- Species: U. musae

Binomial name
- Uredo musae Cummins, (1941)

Species of fungus

Uredo musae is a fungus that is a plant pathogen, infecting bananas.
