= Sphenospora kevorkianii =

Scientific classification
- Kingdom: Fungi
- Division: Basidiomycota
- Class: Pucciniomycetes
- Order: Pucciniales
- Family: Raveneliaceae
- Genus: Sphenospora
- Species: S. kevorkianii

Binomial name
- Sphenospora kevorkianii Linder, (1944)

Species of fungus

Sphenospora kevorkianii is a plant pathogen infecting cattleyas.
