= Uredo behnickiana =

Scientific classification
- Kingdom: Fungi
- Division: Basidiomycota
- Class: Pucciniomycetes
- Order: Pucciniales
- Family: Pucciniaceae
- Genus: Uredo
- Species: U. behnickiana

Binomial name
- Uredo behnickiana Henn. (1905)

Species of fungus

Uredo behnickiana is a fungal plant pathogen. It is known as a pathogen of Cattleya orchids.
