= Gloeosporium cattleyae =

Scientific classification
- Kingdom: Fungi
- Division: Ascomycota
- Class: Leotiomycetes
- Order: Helotiales
- Family: Dermateaceae
- Genus: Gloeosporium
- Species: G. cattleyae

Binomial name
- Gloeosporium cattleyae Sacc. & D. Sacc. (1906)

Species of fungus

Gloeosporium cattleyae is a fungal plant pathogen. It was first described by Pier Andrea Saccardo and Domenico Saccardo in 1906.
