= Uredo nigropuncta =

Scientific classification
- Kingdom: Fungi
- Division: Basidiomycota
- Class: Pucciniomycetes
- Order: Pucciniales
- Family: Pucciniaceae
- Genus: Uredo
- Species: U. nigropuncta

Binomial name
- Uredo nigropuncta Henn. (1896)

Species of fungus

Uredo nigropuncta is a fungal plant pathogen. It is known as a pathogen of Cattleya orchids.
