= Phaeomoniella =

Scientific classification
- Kingdom: Fungi
- Division: Ascomycota
- Class: Eurotiomycetes
- Order: Phaeomoniellales
- Family: Celotheliaceae
- Genus: Phaeomoniella; Crous & W.Gams (2000)

Species
- P. chlamydospora P. pinifoliorum

Genus of fungi

Phaeomoniella is a genus of hyphomycete fungi in the family Celotheliaceae. The genus was circumscribed by Pedro Crous and Walter Gams in 2000 to contain the type species, P. chlamydospora, the causal agent of Petro grapevine decline, a disesase in the esca disease complex. Phaeomoniella is similar to Phaeoacremonium, differing in cultural characteristics, and in the morphology of the conidiophores and conidia.

The family Phaeomoniellaceae was proposed by Paul Kirk in 2015, using a reference to the description of the order Phaeomoniellales, circumscribed earlier that year. However, because Celothelium (type genus of Celotheliaceae, a family published in 2008) is also included in the circumscription of the Phaeomoniellaceae, the older family name takes precedence and consequently, Phaeomoniellaceae is an illegitimate name according to nomenclatural rules.

== Species ==
- Phaeomoniella chlamydospora (W.Gams, Crous, M.J.Wingf. & Mugnai) Crous & W.Gams (2000)
- Phaeomoniella pinifoliorum Hyang B.Lee, J.Y.Park, Summerb. & H.S.Jung (2006)

Several species once classified in this genus have since been assigned to other genera:

- Phaeomoniella capensis Crous & A.R.Wood (2008), is now Paraphaeomoniella capensis
- Phaeomoniella dura Damm & Crous (2010), is now Celerioriella dura
- Phaeomoniella effusa Damm & Crous (2010), is now Aequabiliella effusa
- Phaeomoniella niveniae Crous (2011), is now Neophaeomoniella niveniae
- Phaeomoniella prunicola Damm & Crous (2010), is now Celerioriella prunicola
- Phaeomoniella tardicola Damm & Crous (2010), is now Minutiella tardicola
- Phaeomoniella zymoides Hyang B.Lee, J.Y.Park, Summerb. & H.S.Jung (2006), is now Neophaeomoniella zymoides
