= Grapevine trunk disease =

Plant disease

Grapevine trunk diseases (GTD) are the most destructive diseases of vineyards worldwide. Fungicides (such as sodium arsenite or 8-hydroxyquinoline, used to fight esca) with the potential to control GTD have been banned in Europe and there are no highly effective treatments available. Action to develop new strategies to fight these diseases are needed.

The following fungal species are responsible for grapevine trunk diseases:

- Botryosphaeria dothidea and other Botryosphaeria species, such as B. obtusa, B. parva and B. australis,
- Cylindrocarpon spp., Ilyonectria spp., Dactylonectria spp. and Campylocarpon spp. (cause of black foot disease)
- Diplodia seriata (cause of bot canker)
- Diplodia mutila (cause of Botryosphaeria dieback)
- Dothiorella iberica
- Dothiorella viticola
- Eutypa lata (cause of Eutypa dieback)
- Fomitiporia mediterranea (cause of esca)
- Lasiodiplodia theobromae (cause of Botryosphaeria dieback)
- Neofusicoccum australe
- Neofusicoccum luteum
- Neofusicoccom parvum
- Phaeoacremonium minimum (cause of esca and Petri disease) and other Phaeoacremonium species
- Phaeomoniella chlamydospora (cause of esca and Petri disease)
- Sporocadus incarnatus and other Sporocadus species.

Also Inonotus, Diatrype and Phaeoacremonium species.
