= Phaeoacremonium aleophilum =

Scientific classification
- Kingdom: Fungi
- Division: Ascomycota
- Class: Sordariomycetes
- Order: Togniniales
- Family: Togniniaceae
- Genus: Phaeoacremonium
- Species: P. aleophilum

Binomial name
- Phaeoacremonium aleophilum W. Gams, Crous, M.J. Wingf. & Mugnai (1996)

Species of fungus

Phaeoacremonium aleophilum is a fungus species in the genus Phaeoacremonium. It is associated with Phaeomoniella chlamydospora in esca in mature grapevines and decline in young vines (Petri disease), two types of grapevine trunk disease.

Togninia minima is the teleomorph (the sexual reproductive stage) of P. aleophilum.
