= Fomitiporia gabonensis =

Scientific classification
- Domain: Eukaryota
- Kingdom: Fungi
- Division: Basidiomycota
- Class: Agaricomycetes
- Order: Hymenochaetales
- Family: Hymenochaetaceae
- Genus: Fomitiporia
- Species: F. gabonensis

Binomial name
- Fomitiporia gabonensis Decock & Yombiyeni (2010)

Species of fungus

Fomitiporia gabonensis is a fungus in the family Hymenochaetaceae. It was first isolated from Sub-Saharan Africa, specifically in the Guineo-Congolian forest. It has a pileate basidiome, small basidiospores and an absence of setae. Morphological features that differentiate this species with F. nobilissima and F. ivindoensis are its pileus' shape, pore surface color and diameter, as well as its ecology.
