= Celothelium =

Scientific classification
- Kingdom: Fungi
- Division: Ascomycota
- Class: Eurotiomycetes
- Order: Phaeomoniellales
- Family: Celotheliaceae
- Genus: Celothelium; A.Massal. (1860)

Type species
- Celothelium socialis (Zenker) A.Massal. (1860)

Genus of lichen-forming fungi

Celothelium is a genus of lichen-forming fungi in the family Celotheliaceae. These lichens typically have a thin, crust-like thallus that often grows beneath the surface of tree bark or rocks in tropical rainforests and coastal areas. Celothelium species are characterised by small, black, shiny reproductive structures (perithecia), and thread-like spores. The genus has had an uncertain taxonomic history since its original description in 1860, but recent genetic studies have placed it in its own distinct group within the fungal class Eurotiomycetes. Celothelium species have been found in various parts of the world, including Asia, Europe, and the Americas.

== Taxonomy ==
The genus was circumscribed by Abramo Bartolommeo Massalongo in 1860. Its taxonomic placement has been uncertain, with various classifications proposed over time. Initially, it was thought to be related to Leptorhaphis in the Trypetheliaceae. Later, it was placed in the Thelenellaceae, and then in the order Pyrenulales. Celothelium socialis has been assigned as the type species, although the validity of this name as well as the nature of this taxon is still unclear.

Molecular phylogenetics studies have clarified that Celothelium belongs to the class Eurotiomycetes, subclass Chaetothyriomycetidae. However, it does not group with other members of the Pyrenulales as previously thought. Instead, Celothelium forms a distinct lineage along with various anamorphic fungi from genera like Dolabra and Phaeomoniella. Based on this phylogenetic evidence, Celothelium is now placed in its own family, Celotheliaceae. Some researchers have proposed recognising this lineage as a new order, tentatively called Celotheliales. This order would include lichen-forming fungi (Celothelium) as well as some plant pathogens like Phaeomoniella chlamydospora and Dolabra nepheliae.

== Description ==
Celothelium is characterised by a crusty (crustose) thallus, which is often difficult to see because it grows mostly beneath the surface of its substrate, such as tree bark or rock. The reproductive structures of the lichen, the perithecia, are small, black, and shiny, and may be scattered individually or found in small groups. These structures are initially embedded within the thallus but later emerge, becoming dome-shaped or flattened. Each perithecium has a small opening (an ostiole) located in a central bump that allows for the release of spores.

Surrounding groups of perithecia is a dark layer known as the involucrellum, which is composed of both bark material and reddish-brown fungal threads (hyphae). This forms a protective shield referred to as a clypeus. The outer layer of the perithecia, the exciple, blends with the involucrellum and is mostly visible around the edges of the perithecia. The exciple is made of pale to brown fungal threads mixed with bark cells, forming a tightly woven structure.

Inside the perithecia, there are filamentous structures called paraphysoids that are branched and interwoven, aiding in spore dispersal. The fungi lack periphyses, another type of hair-like structure often found in similar fungi. The internal gel of the spore-producing area (hymenial gel) reacts to certain iodine stains (a hemiamyloid reaction), showing a distinctive blue colour near the tip of the spore-producing cells.

The asci, which are the spore-producing cells within the perithecia, are cylindrical and contain eight spores each. These asci have a two-layered structure: a thin, smooth outer layer and an inner layer without a noticeable apical beak. The spores inside the asci are thread-like to needle-like, translucent (hyaline), and divided by multiple internal partitions (multiseptate). They are often twisted within the asci and have pointed ends.

Pycnidia, which are the structures responsible for asexual reproduction, may be embedded within the lichen or found on its surface. These dark brown to black structures produce conidia (asexual spores) from specialised bottle-shaped cells. The conidia are also thread-like, clear, and multiseptate.

The lichen's photosynthetic partner (photobiont) is from Trentepohlia, a genus of green algae, which forms the green component of the lichen. Unlike many lichens, species in this genus do not typically produce secondary metabolites known as lichen substances.

== Habitat and distribution ==
Found on branches in rainforests and coastal areas, Celothelium species largely occur in tropical areas. The genus has been recorded from Asia, Europe, Central America and South America.

== Species ==
As of September 2024, Species Fungorum (in the Catalogue of Life) accept four species of Celothelium, although several more have been proposed.

- Celothelium aciculiferum (Nyl.) Vain. (1915) – Central America; South America
- Celothelium agminellum (Müll.Arg.) Vain. (1915) – Cuba
- Celothelium buxi (J.Steiner) M.B.Aguirre (1991) – Central Europe; Caucasus Mountains
- Celothelium cinchonarum (Müll.Arg.) Vain. (1915) – Brazil
- Celothelium dominicanum (Vain.) M.B.Aguirre (1991) – West Indies
- Celothelium ischnobelum (Nyl.) M.B.Aguirre (1991) – Europe
- Celothelium leprieurii Trevis. (1861)
- Celothelium longisporum K.H.Moon & Aptroot (2013) – Cambodia
- Celothelium lutescens F.Berger & Aptroot (1998) – Central Europe
- Celothelium nudum (Fée) Trevis. (1861)
- Celothelium stenobelum (Nyl.) M.B.Aguirre (1991) – Sri Lanka
