= Fomitiporia ivindoensis =

Scientific classification
- Domain: Eukaryota
- Kingdom: Fungi
- Division: Basidiomycota
- Class: Agaricomycetes
- Order: Hymenochaetales
- Family: Hymenochaetaceae
- Genus: Fomitiporia
- Species: F. ivindoensis

Binomial name
- Fomitiporia ivindoensis Decock & Yombiyeni (2010)

Species of fungus

Fomitiporia ivindoensis is a fungus in the family Hymenochaetaceae. It was first isolated from Sub-Saharan Africa, specifically in the Guineo-Congolian forest. It has a pileate basidiome, small basidiospores and an absence of setae. Morphological features that differentiate this species with F. nobilissima and F. gabonensis are its pileus' shape, pore surface color and diameter, as well as its ecology.
