= Neofusicoccum arbuti =

Scientific classification
- Kingdom: Fungi
- Division: Ascomycota
- Class: Dothideomycetes
- Order: Botryosphaeriales
- Family: Botryosphaeriaceae
- Genus: Neofusicoccum
- Species: N. arbuti

Binomial name
- Neofusicoccum arbuti (D.F. Farr & M. Elliott) Crous, Slippers & A.J.L. Phillips 2006

Synonyms
- Fusicoccum arbuti D.F. Farr & M. Elliott 2005

Species of fungus

Neofusicoccum arbuti is a fungus species in the genus Neofusicoccum. It was first described by D.F. Farr & M. Elliott, and given its current name by Crous, Slippers & A.J.L. Phillips in 2006. Neofusicoccum arbuti is included in the genus Neofusicoccum and the family Botryosphaeriaceae. This species is known as madrone canker. N. arbuti is a potentially lethal canker disease of Pacific madrone, Arbutus menziesii.

No subspecies are listed in the Catalogue of Life.
