= Neofusicoccum australe =

Scientific classification
- Kingdom: Fungi
- Division: Ascomycota
- Class: Dothideomycetes
- Order: Botryosphaeriales
- Family: Botryosphaeriaceae
- Genus: Neofusicoccum
- Species: N. australe

Binomial name
- Neofusicoccum australe Slippers, Crous & M.J. Wingf. 2004

Synonyms
- Fusicoccum australe; Botryosphaeria australis

Species of fungus

Neofusicoccum australe is a fungus species in the genus Neofusicoccum. It is responsible for a grapevine trunk disease.

A 2009 survey of endophytic fungi on woody species at two tuart woodlands of Southwest Australia (ecoregion), sampling acacia Acacia cochlearis, A. rostellifera, the sheoak Allocasuarina fraseriana, peppermint Agonis flexuosa, Banksia grandis, Eucalyptus marginata, sandalwood Santalum acuminatum and nominate species Corymbia calophylla (tuart), found around three quarters of isolates were taxa of the family Botryosphaeriaceae, eighty percent of which was this species.
