= Phaeomoniella chlamydospora =

Scientific classification
- Domain: Eukaryota
- Kingdom: Fungi
- Division: Ascomycota
- Class: Eurotiomycetes
- Order: Phaeomoniellales
- Family: Celotheliaceae
- Genus: Phaeomoniella
- Species: P. chlamydospora

Binomial name
- Phaeomoniella chlamydospora (W.Gams, Crous, M.J.Wingf. & Mugnai) Crous & W.Gams (2000)

Synonyms
- Phaeoacremonium chlamydosporum W.Gams, Crous, M.J.Wingf. & Mugnai (1996)

Species of fungus

Phaeomoniella chlamydospora is a fungus species of mitosporic ascomycota in the genus Phaeomoniella.

Phaeomoniella chlamydospora and Phaeoacremonium aleophilum are associated with esca in mature grapevines, decline in young vines (Petri disease) and black goo decline, three types of grapevine trunk disease.
