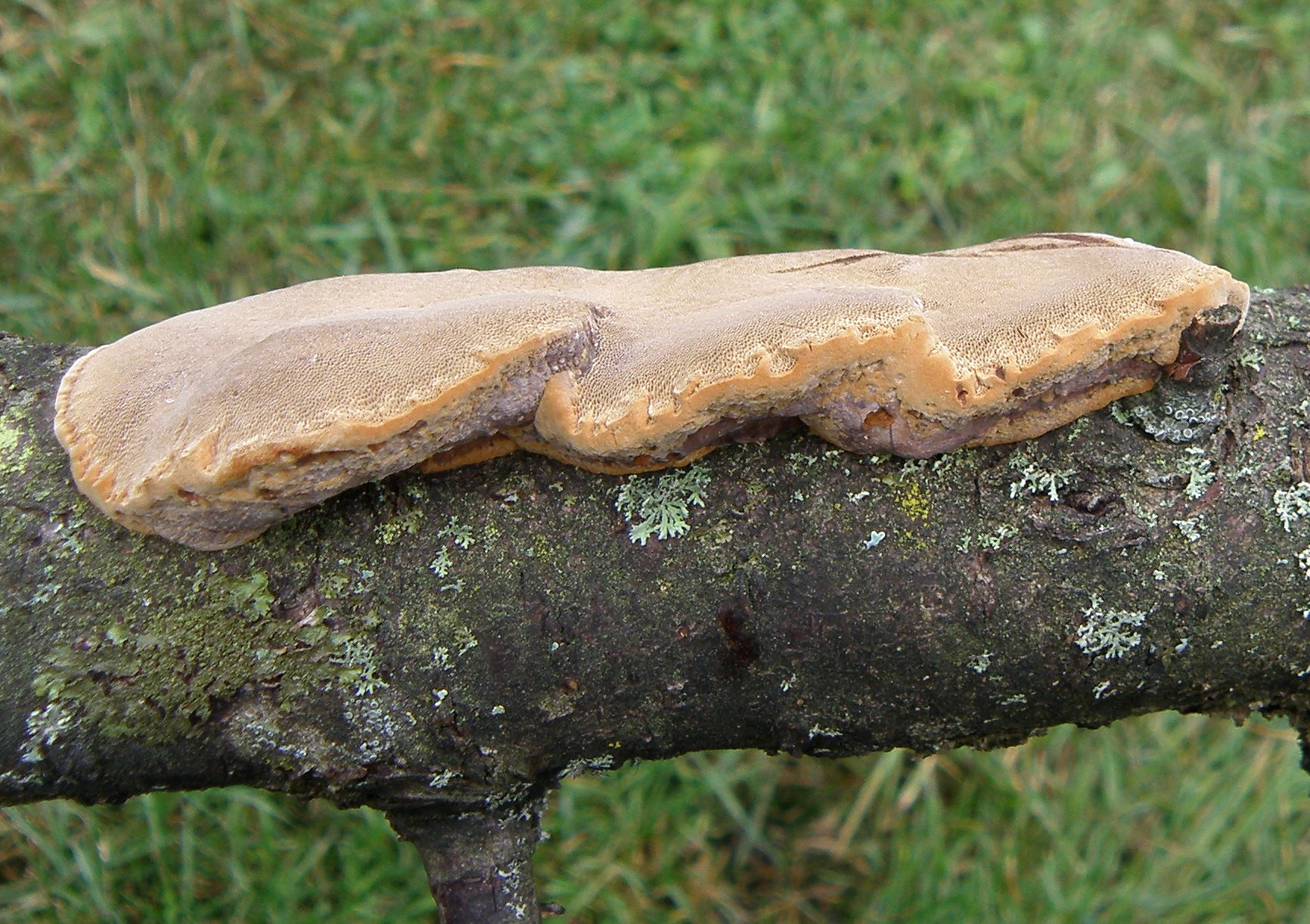
- Fomitiporia punctata

Scientific classification
- Kingdom: Fungi
- Division: Basidiomycota
- Class: Agaricomycetes
- Order: Hymenochaetales
- Family: Hymenochaetaceae
- Genus: Fomitiporia; Murrill (1907)

Type species
- Fomitiporia langloisii Murrill (1907)

= Fomitiporia =

Genus of fungi

Fomitiporia is a genus of fungi in the family Hymenochaetaceae. According to a 2008 estimate, the widely distributed genus contains 11 species, though three new species were identified in 2010 in sub-Saharan Africa using multigene molecular phylogenetic analysis, and two more were named in a 2013 article. In 2011 it was announced that a specimen of the species F. ellipsoidea was discovered with a fruit body that is largest known of any fungus. However, the species has since been moved to Phellinus.

== Species ==
- Fomitiporia aethiopica Decock, Bitew & G.Castillo (2005) – Ethiopia
- Fomitiporia apiahyna (Speg.) Robledo, Decock & Rajchenb. (2010)
- Fomitiporia atlantica Alves-Silva, Reck & Drechsler-Santos (2016) – Brazil
- Fomitiporia australiensis M.Fisch., J.Edwards, Cunningt. & Pascoe 2005
- Fomitiporia baccharidis (Pat.) Decock, Robledo & Amalfi (2014)
- Fomitiporia bakeri (Murrill) Vlasák & Kout (2011)
- Fomitiporia bannaensis Y.C.Dai (2001)
- Fomitiporia capensis M.Fisch., M.Cloete, L.Mostert & F.Halleen (2014)
- Fomitiporia castilloi Decock & Amalfi (2013) – French Guiana
- Fomitiporia cupressicola Amalfi, Raymundo, Valenz. & Decock (2012)
- Fomitiporia deserticola – United States
- Fomitiporia expansa Decock & Amalfi (2014)
- Fomitiporia fissurata – United States
- Fomitiporia gabonensis Amalfi & Decock (2010)
- Fomitiporia hesleri M.Fisch. (2004)
- Fomitiporia hippophaëicola (H.Jahn) Fiasson & Niemelä (1984)
- Fomitiporia ivindoensis Decock, Amalfi & Yombiyeni (2010)
- Fomitiporia mediterranea M.Fisch. (2002)
- Fomitiporia neotropica Campos-Santana, Amalfi, R.M.Silveira, Robledo & Decock (2014)
- Fomitiporia nobilissima Decock & Yombiyeni (2010)
- Fomitiporia pentaphylacis L.W.Zhou (2012)
- Fomitiporia polymorpha M.Fisch. (2004)
- Fomitiporia pseudopunctata (A.David, Dequatre & Fiasson) Fiasson (1984)
- Fomitiporia punctata (P.Karst.) Murrill (1947)
- Fomitiporia punicata Y.C.Dai, B.K.Cui & Decock (2008)
- Fomitiporia repanda (Overh.) Ginns (2014)
- Fomitiporia robusta (P.Karst.) Fiasson & Niemelä (1984)
- Fomitiporia rosmarini (Bernicchia) Ghob.-Nejh. & Y.C.Dai (2007)
- Fomitiporia sancti-champagnatii G.Coelho, R.M.Silveira & Rajchenb. (2009)
- Fomitiporia spinescens (J.E.Wright & G.Coelho) G.Coelho, Guerrero & Rajchenb. (2009)
- Fomitiporia subtilissima Alves-Silva, Reck & Drechsler-Santos (2016) – Brazil
- Fomitiporia tabaquilio (Urcelay, Robledo & Rajchenb.) Decock & Robledo (2008)
- Fomitiporia tenuis Decock, Bitew & G.Castillo (2005) – Ethiopia
- Fomitiporia tenuitubus L.W.Zhou (2012)
- Fomitiporia texana (Murrill) Nuss (1986)
- Fomitiporia torreyae Y.C.Dai & B.K.Cui (2006)
- Fomitiporia uncinata (Rajchenb.) G.Coelho, Guerrero & Rajchenb. (2009)
