= Neofusicoccum pennatisporum =

Scientific classification
- Kingdom: Fungi
- Division: Ascomycota
- Class: Dothideomycetes
- Order: Botryosphaeriales
- Family: Botryosphaeriaceae
- Genus: Neofusicoccum
- Species: N. pennatisporum

Binomial name
- Neofusicoccum pennatisporum Taylor et al., 2009

Species of fungus

Neofusicoccum pennatisporum is an endophytic fungus that might be a canker pathogen, specifically for Eucalyptus gomphocephala. It was isolated from said trees in Western Australia.
