= Togninia =

Scientific classification
- Kingdom: Fungi
- Division: Ascomycota
- Class: Sordariomycetes
- Order: Togniniales
- Family: Togniniaceae
- Genus: Togninia; Berl. 1900

Species
- Togninia fraxinopennsylvanica; Togninia minima (Tul. & C. Tul.) Berl. 1900; Togninia novae-zealandiae

Genus of fungi

Togninia is a fungus genus and the type genus in the family Togniniaceae. It is the teleomorph (the sexual reproductive stage) of Phaeoacremonium.

The genus name of Togninia is in honour of Filippo Tognini (1868–1896), who was an Italian botanist (Mycology and Lichenology), who worked in Florence and was curator of the botanical garden in Padua.
