= Arbutus menziesii =

Pacific madrone
- Pacific madrone on Mount Tam

Conservation status
- Least Concern (IUCN 3.1)

- Secure (NatureServe)

Scientific classification
- Kingdom: Plantae
- Clade: Tracheophytes
- Clade: Angiosperms
- Clade: Eudicots
- Clade: Asterids
- Order: Ericales
- Family: Ericaceae
- Genus: Arbutus
- Species: A. menziesii

Binomial name
- Arbutus menziesii Pursh
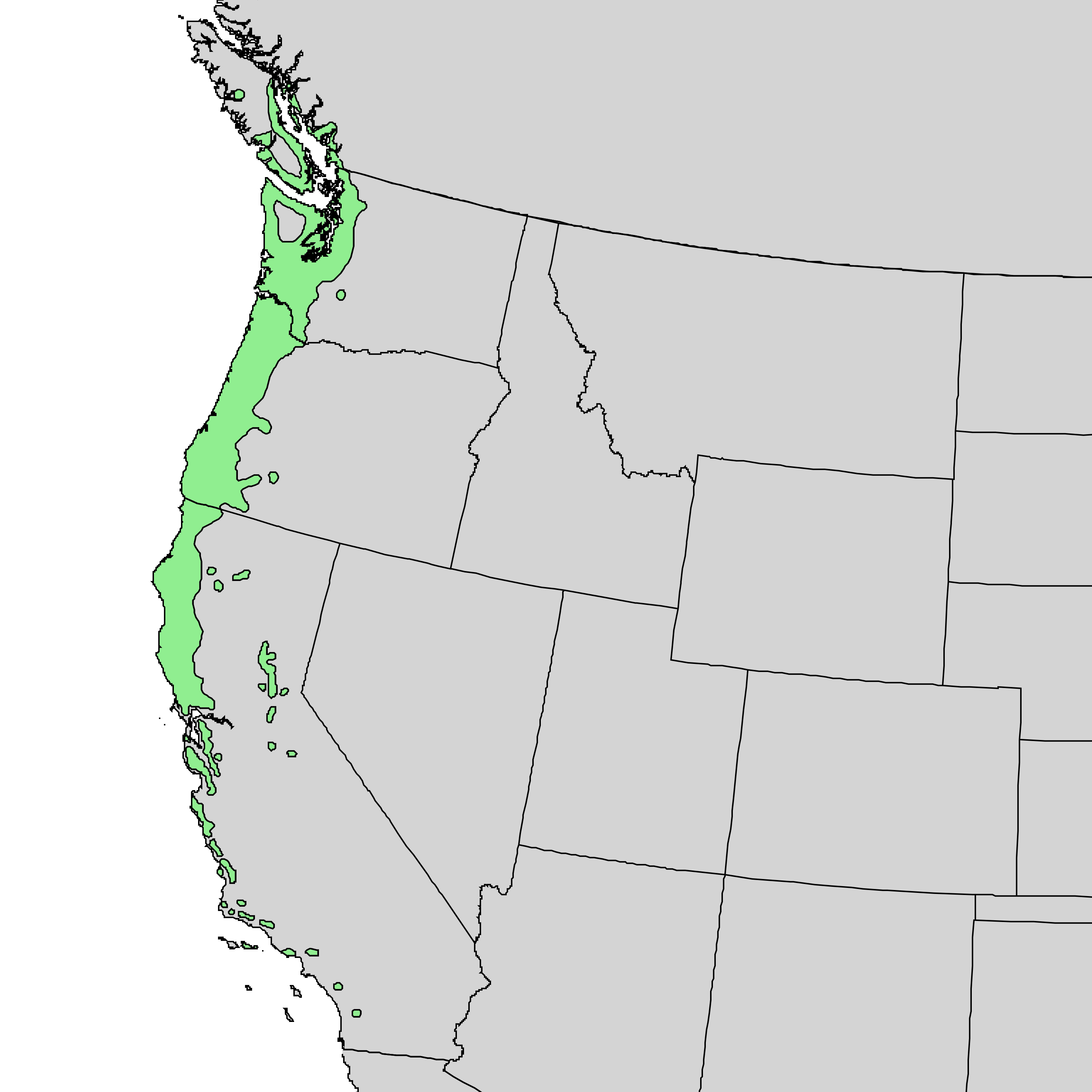
- Natural range of Arbutus menziesii

Synonyms
- Arbutus menziesii var. elliptica DC.; Arbutus menziesii var. oblongifolia DC.; Arbutus procera Douglas ex Lindl. 1836 not Sol. ex DC. 1839

Species of evergreen tree

Arbutus menziesii, or Pacific madrone (commonly madrone or madrona in the United States and arbutus in Canada), is a species of broadleaf evergreen tree in the family Ericaceae. It has waxy foliage, a contorted growth habit, and flaky bark.

It is native to the western coastal areas of North America, from British Columbia to California.

== Description ==
Arbutus menziesii is an evergreen tree about 10 to 25 metres (33 to 82 feet) in height, but in the right conditions up to 30 m (98 ft). The trunk usually has a diameter at breast height of about 60 centimetres (24 inches). The thin bark is a rich orange-red, and when mature naturally peels away in thin sheets, leaving a greenish, silvery appearance that has a smooth satin sheen. Older trunks are gray-brown near the base. Individual trees can live for over 300 years.

The leaves are thick with a waxy texture, elliptical, 7 to 15 cm (2 3/4 to 6 in) long and 4 to 8 cm (1 1/2 to 3 1/4 in) broad, arranged spirally; they are glossy dark green above and a lighter, more grayish green beneath, with an entire margin. The leaves are evergreen, lasting a few years before detaching. Some second-year leaves turn orange to red and detach in the autumn. In the north of its range, wet winters often promote a brown to black leaf discoloration due to fungal infections; the stain lasts until the leaves naturally detach at the end of their lifespan.

In spring, the tree bears sprays of small white to pink, bell-like flowers, and in autumn, red berries.

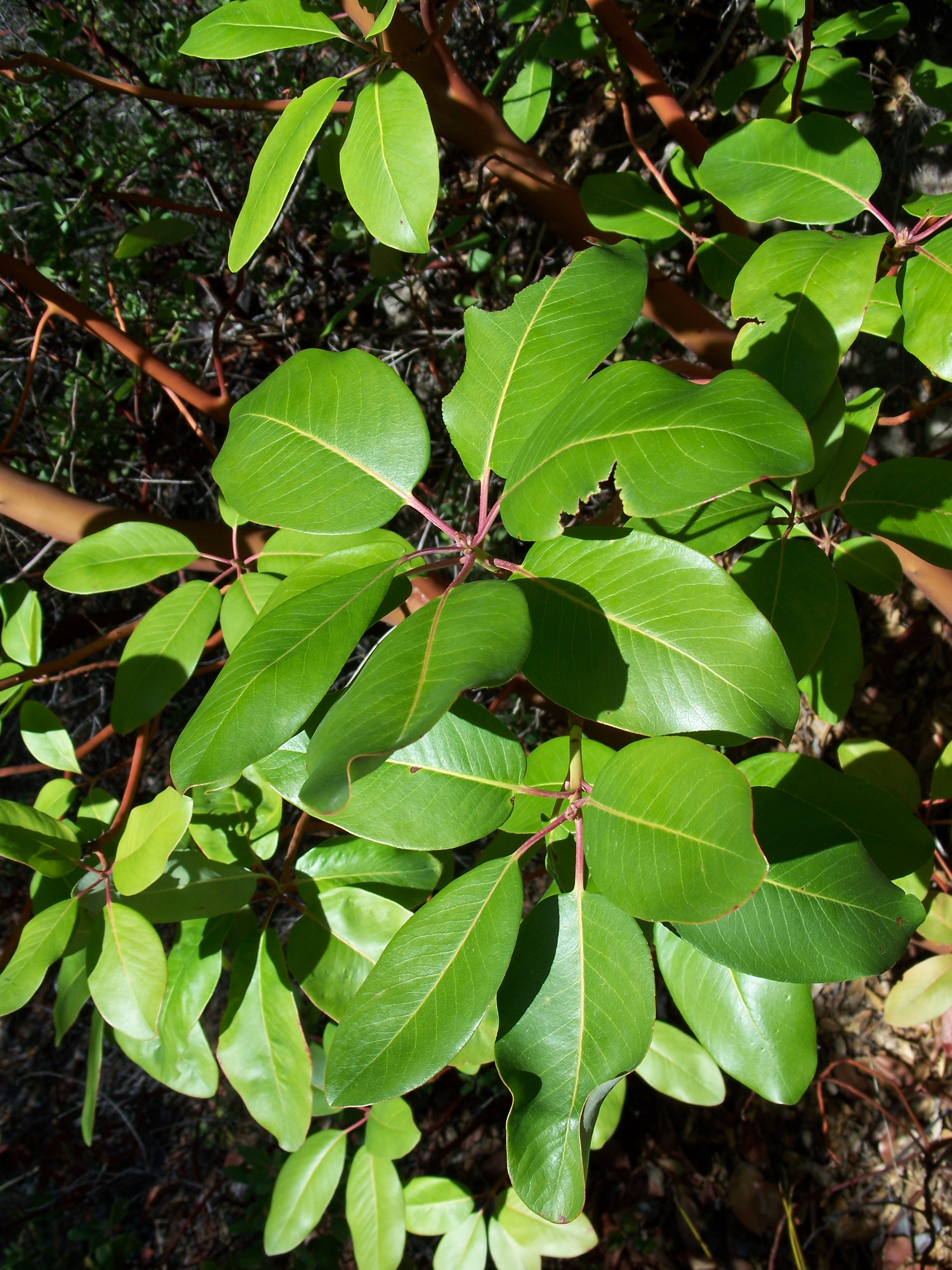
Leaves

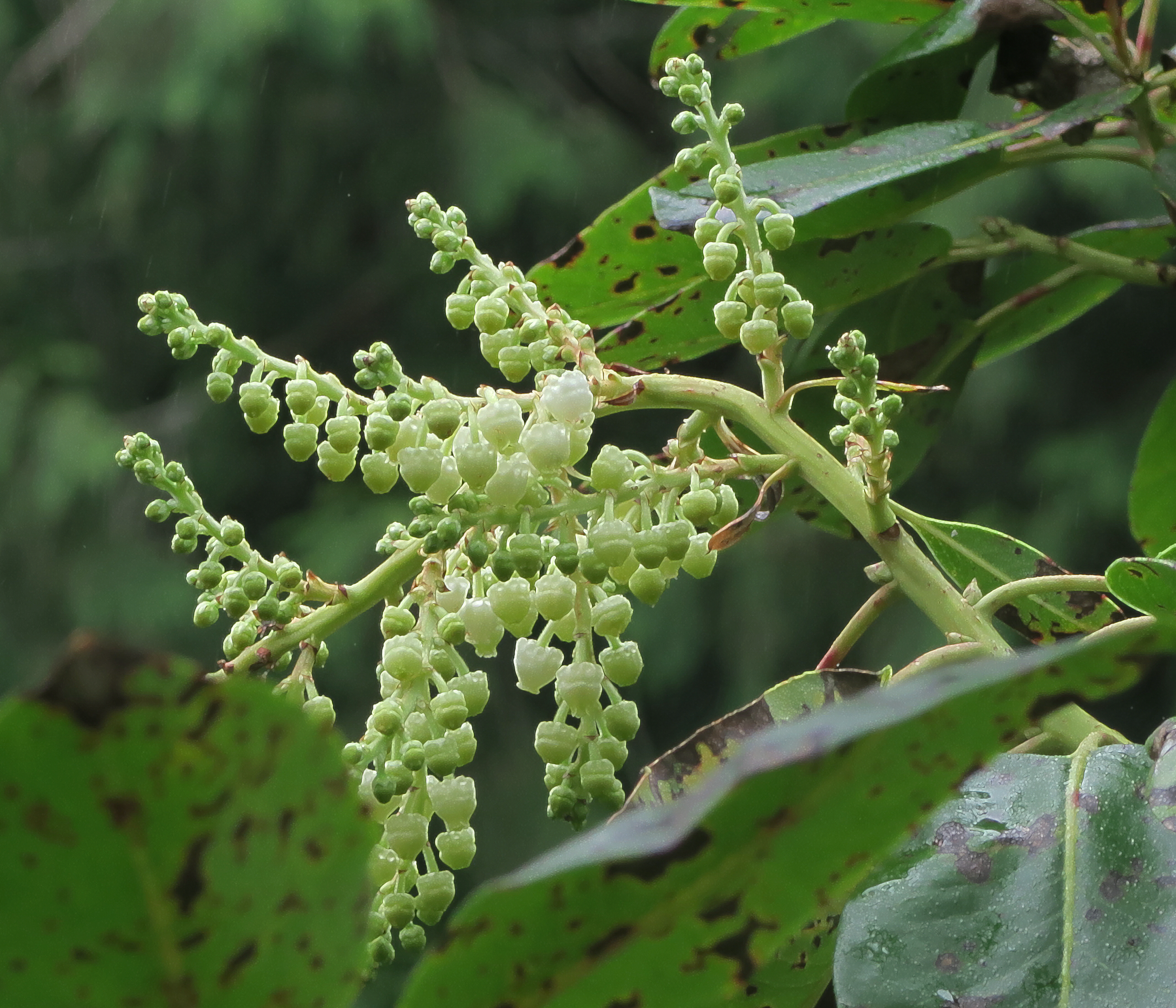
In spring, it bears sprays of small, white, bell-shaped flowers.

Fruit

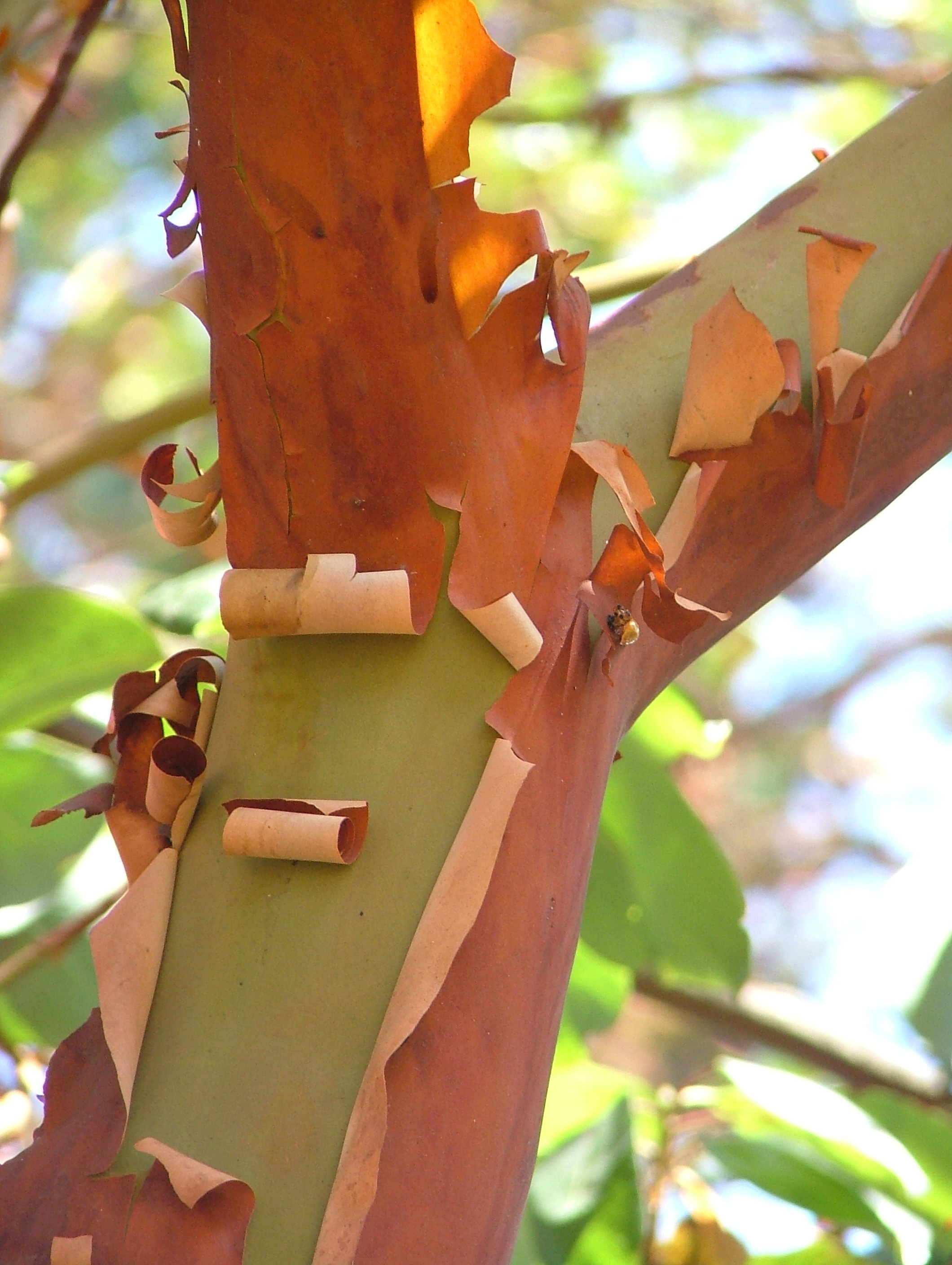
The peeling red papery bark is distinctive

== Common names ==
It is nicknamed the "refrigerator tree" because its bark contains water, and it stays cool in the summer.

In Canada, it is simply referred to as arbutus. It is known in the United States as the madrona, madrone, madroño, madroña, or bearberry. The name strawberry tree (A. unedo) may also be found in relation to A. menziesii (though it has no relation to the strawberry fruit). According to the Sunset Western Garden Book, in the United States, the name "madrone" is more common south of the Siskiyou Mountains of southern Oregon and Northern California and the name "madrona" is more common north of the Siskiyous. The Concow tribe calls the tree dis-tā'-tsi (Konkow language) or kou-wät′-chu. The Saanich people call the tree ḰEḰEIȽĆ (Saanich dialect). Its species name was given it in honor of the Scottish naturalist Archibald Menzies, who noted it during George Vancouver's voyage of exploration.

== Distribution and habitat ==
Madrones are native to the western coast of North America, from British Columbia (chiefly Vancouver Island and the Gulf Islands) to California. They are mainly found in Puget Sound, the Oregon Coast Range, and the California Coast Ranges, but are also scattered on the west slope of the Sierra Nevada and Cascade mountain ranges.

Arbutus menziesii exists in a few relict stands in southern California, presumably survivors from the last glacial age. Here, populations are found on Santa Cruz Island, the San Gabriel Mountains, and south to the Santa Ana Mountains, the Agua Tibia Mountains and Palomar Mountain. The southernmost population is located on Roderick Mountain overlooking the canyon of the San Luis Rey River in San Diego County, where several hundred are found. George Bishop Sudworth reported a few shrubby individuals of Pacific madrone from the Santa Monica Mountains in Los Tuñas Canyon, but this population may not still survive.

One author lists their southern range as extending as far as Baja California in Mexico, but others point out that there are no recorded specimens collected that far south, and the trees are absent from modern surveys of native trees there. However, other Arbutus species are endemic to the area.

It grows in dry and rocky sites, is tolerant of salt water, but fairly intolerant of shade.

== Ecology ==
The tree can be found growing along with Douglas-fir. The thin bark is susceptible to fire, but new saplings readily sprout after such disturbances. Mature trees survive fire, and can regenerate more rapidly after fire than Douglas-firs. Pacific madrone also produce very large numbers of seeds, which sprout following fire. The tree also sprouts from cut stems.

Many mammal and bird species feed off the berries, including juncos, American robins, cedar waxwings, band-tailed pigeons, varied thrushes, quail, mule deer, raccoons, ring-tailed cats, and bears. As the fruit are produced in great quantity and may persist on the tree into winter, their value as a food source is great. Mule deer will also eat the young shoots when the trees are regenerating after fire. The flowers also produce nectar which can be made into honey. Mature leaves are almost always ignored by browsing animals, but young leafy sprouts are eaten by ungulates and the dusky-footed woodrat. It is considered a high-importance winter forage species for many ungulates.

It is important as a nest site for many birds, and in mixed woodland it seems to be chosen for nestbuilding disproportionately to its numbers. This may be due to the susceptibility of the tree to heart rot, which makes it desirable for cavity-nesting birds. Pacific Madrona also provides cover for big game and small mammals, and perching sites for a variety of bird species. They are important habitat for woodpecker and sapsucker species.

=== Pathogens ===
Arbutus menziesii has low disease resistance and hosts many pathogens such as heart rot, butt rot, and stem cankers. It is afflicted by a fungal leaf blister disease caused by Exobasidium vaccinii which causes mostly aesthetic damage. The species is also lethally affected by oomycetes of the genus Phytophthora, including the sudden oak death (Phytophthora ramorum) which damages branches and foliage, and a canker disease caused by Phytophthora cactorum which leads to root and butt rot. Other pathogens include Arbutus canker (Nattrassia mangiferae), which causes shoot blight; Fusicoccum aesculi which causes dieback and creates a burned appearance; and Neofusicoccum arbuti, madrone canker, which cause dead or dying branches, crown dieback, cankers, and sometimes death. Thinning stands, soil loss and compaction, and a host of other impacts increase susceptibility to disease, especially on less dense stands.

== Conservation ==
Although drought tolerant and relatively fast growing, A. menziesii is currently declining throughout most of its range. One likely cause is fire control; under natural conditions, the madrona depends on intermittent naturally occurring fires to reduce the conifer overstory.

Increasing development pressures in its native habitat have also contributed to a decline in the number of mature specimens. This tree is extremely sensitive to alteration of the grade or drainage near the root crown. Until about 1970, this phenomenon was not widely recognized on the west coast; thereafter, many local governments have addressed this issue by stringent restrictions on grading and drainage alterations when A. menziesii trees are present.

Invasive species such as Scotch broom and gorse are a threat to the Pacific madrona as they can invade natural areas and outcompete young saplings for space, light, nutrients, and water.

=== Largest specimen burned ===
During the Soberanes Fire in mid-2016, the largest known specimen of madrone was burned and possibly killed. The tree, 38 m (125 ft) tall and more than 7.6 m (25 ft) in circumference, was listed on the American Forests National Big Tree list, a register of the biggest trees by species in the United States. The tree was located within the Joshua Creek Canyon Ecological Reserve on the Big Sur Coast of California. The fire was caused by an illegal campfire.

== Cultivation ==
The trees are difficult to transplant and a seedling should be set in its permanent spot while still small. Transplant mortality becomes significant once a madrone is more than 30 cm (1 ft) tall. The site should be sunny (south- or west-facing slopes are best), well drained, and lime-free (although occasionally a seedling will establish itself on a shell midden). In its native range, a tree needs no extra water or food once it has become established.

== Uses ==
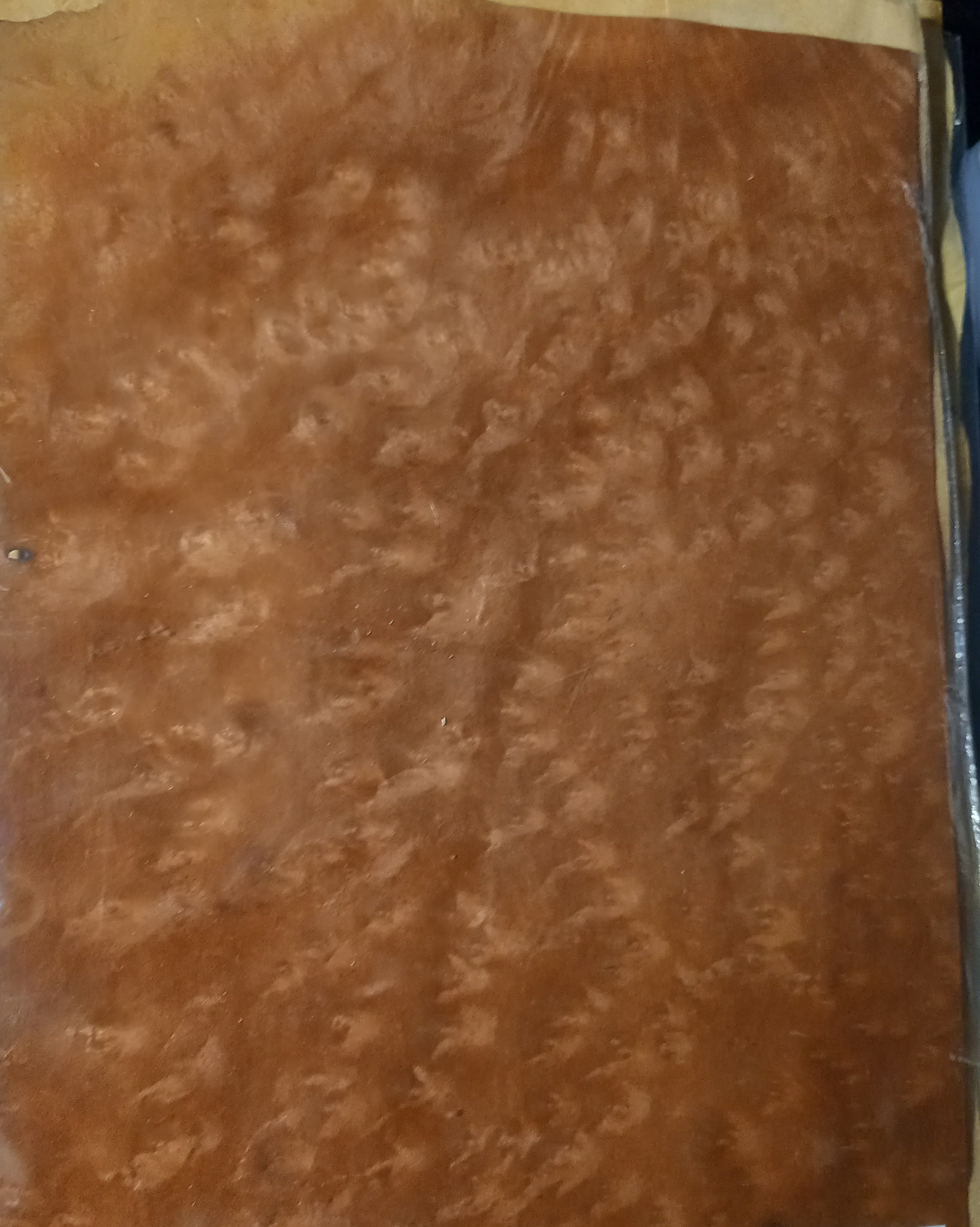
Madrona burl

The berries are considered unpalatable and may be harmful if consumed by people or pets. According to legend, Native Americans ate the berries raw and cooked, but because the berries have a high tannin content and are thus astringent, they more often chewed them or made them into a cider. Overeating causes cramps. Native Americans also use the berries to make necklaces and other decorations, and as bait for fishing (as did the Karuk people to catch steelhead). The bark was often made into tea to be drunk for supposed medicinal purposes.

Early Californian settlers may have used charcoal from the species to make gunpowder.

The wood is non-durable to perishable, and has a warm color after finishing, so it has become more popular as a flooring material, especially in the Pacific Northwest. An attractive veneer, named as Madrona burl, can also be made from the wood or the root, commercially also called as arbutus, madrone or Pacific madrone.

However, because large pieces of madrona lumber warp severely and unpredictably during the drying process, they are not used much. Madrone is burned for firewood, though, since it is a very hard and dense wood that burns long. The W̱SÁNEĆ people of British Columbia have a prohibition against burning arbutus due to its salvific role in their creation myths; an arbutus anchored their canoes to the world during the deluge.

== Gallery ==
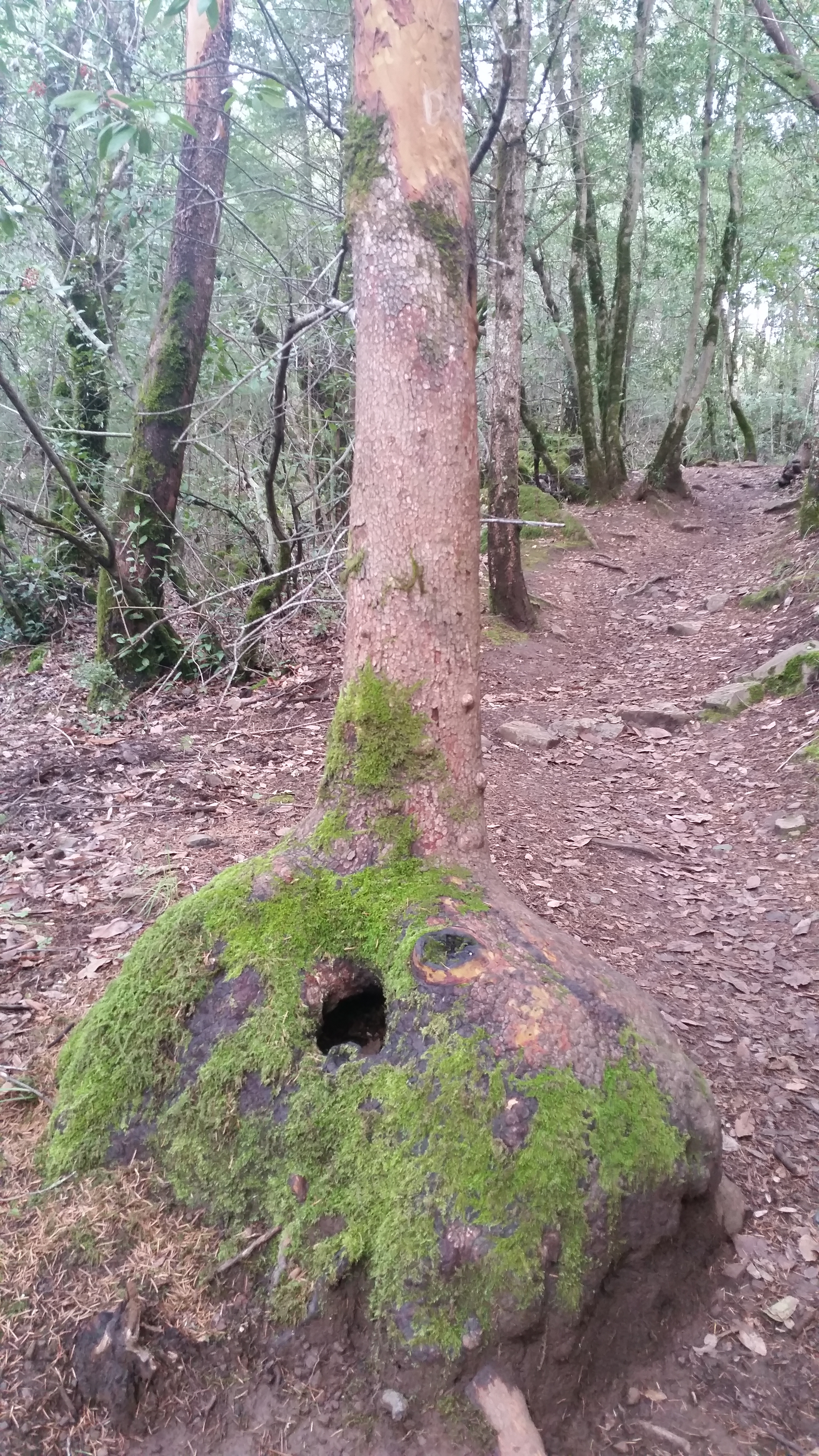
Arbutus menziesii lignotuber near ground level provides fire-resistant storage of energy and sprouting buds if fire damage requires replacement of the trunk or limbs.

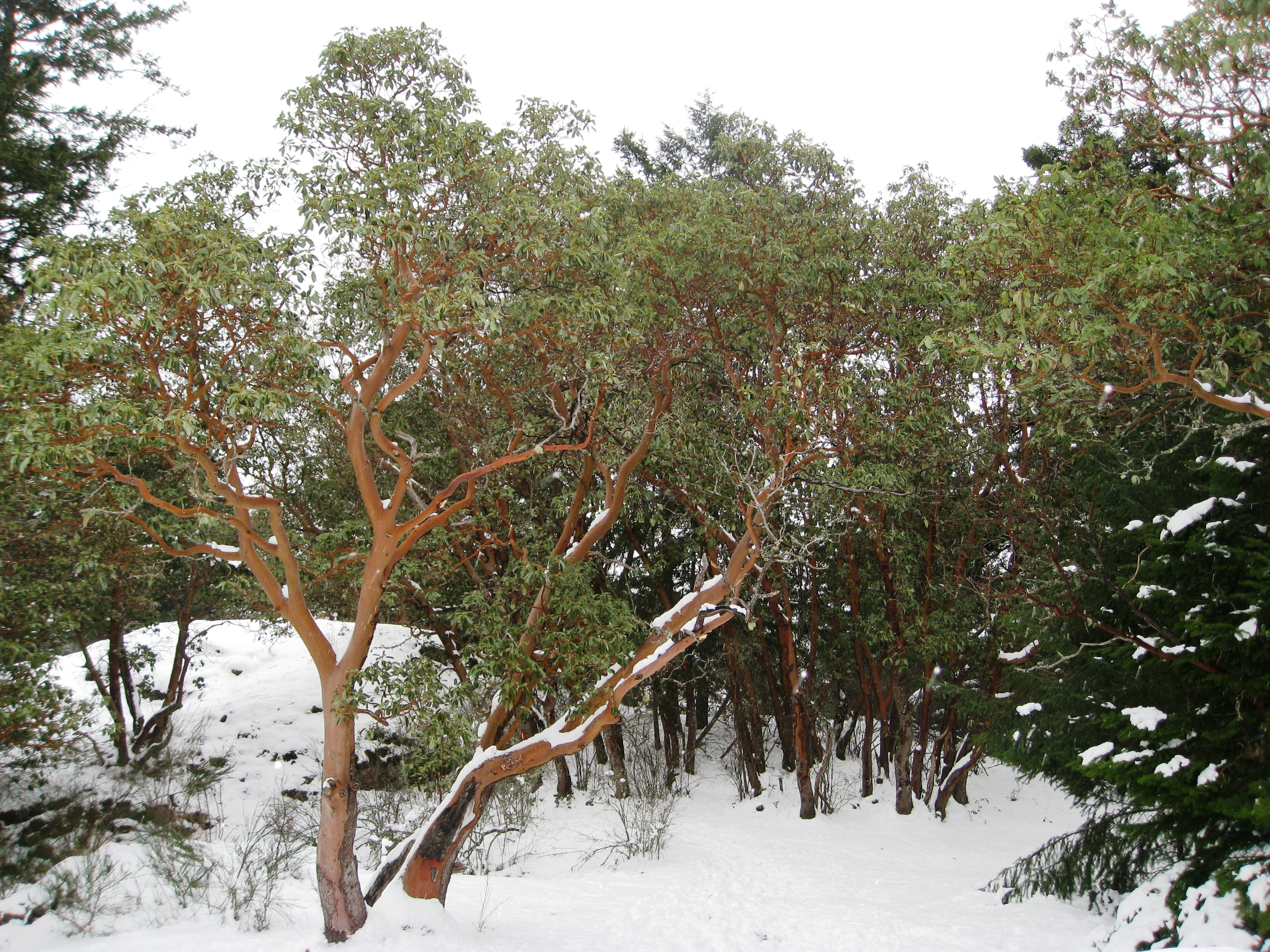
Tree growing in snow at Gowlland Tod Provincial Park, British Columbia

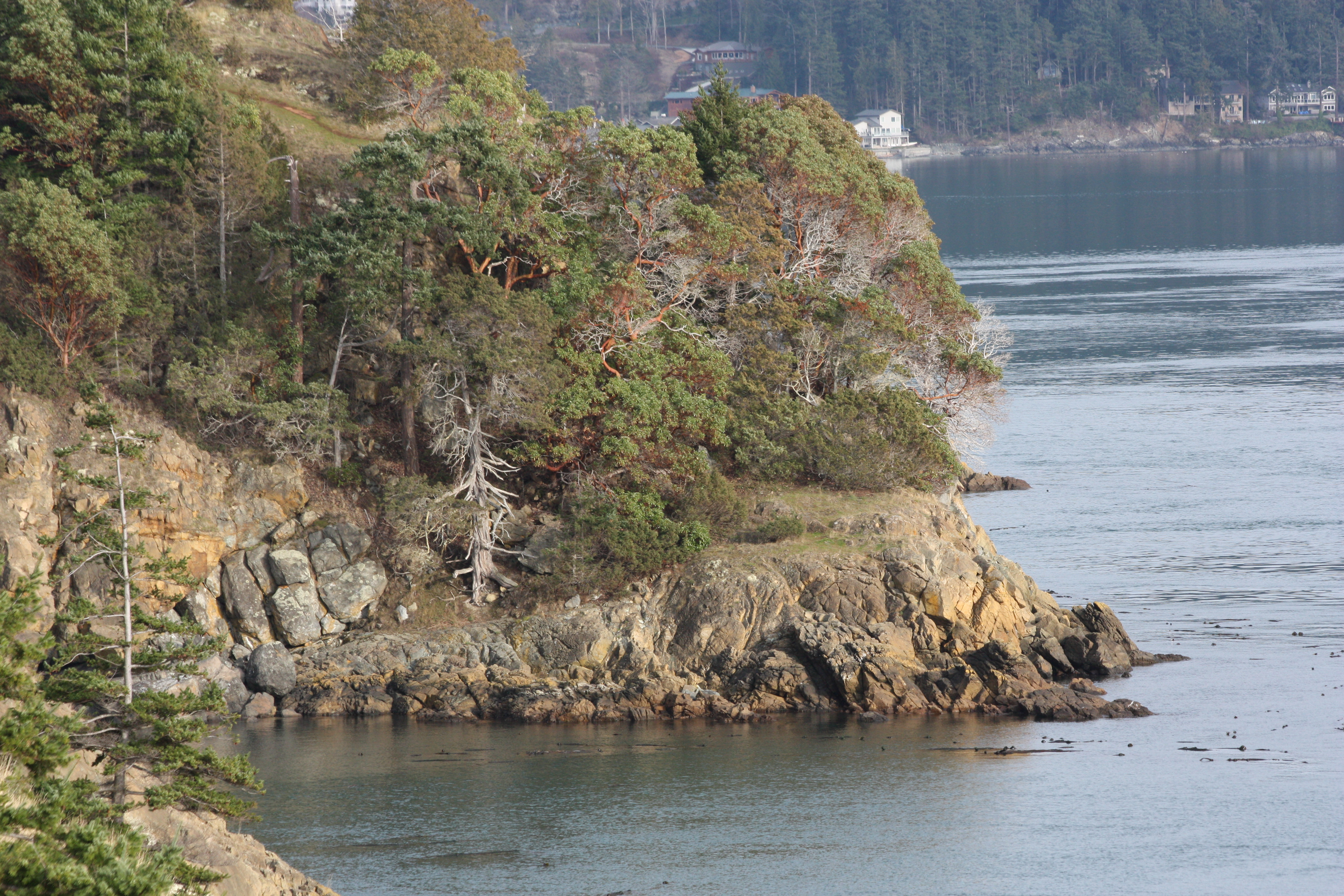
Trees growing with Pseudotsuga menziesii var. menziesii in Anacortes, Washington

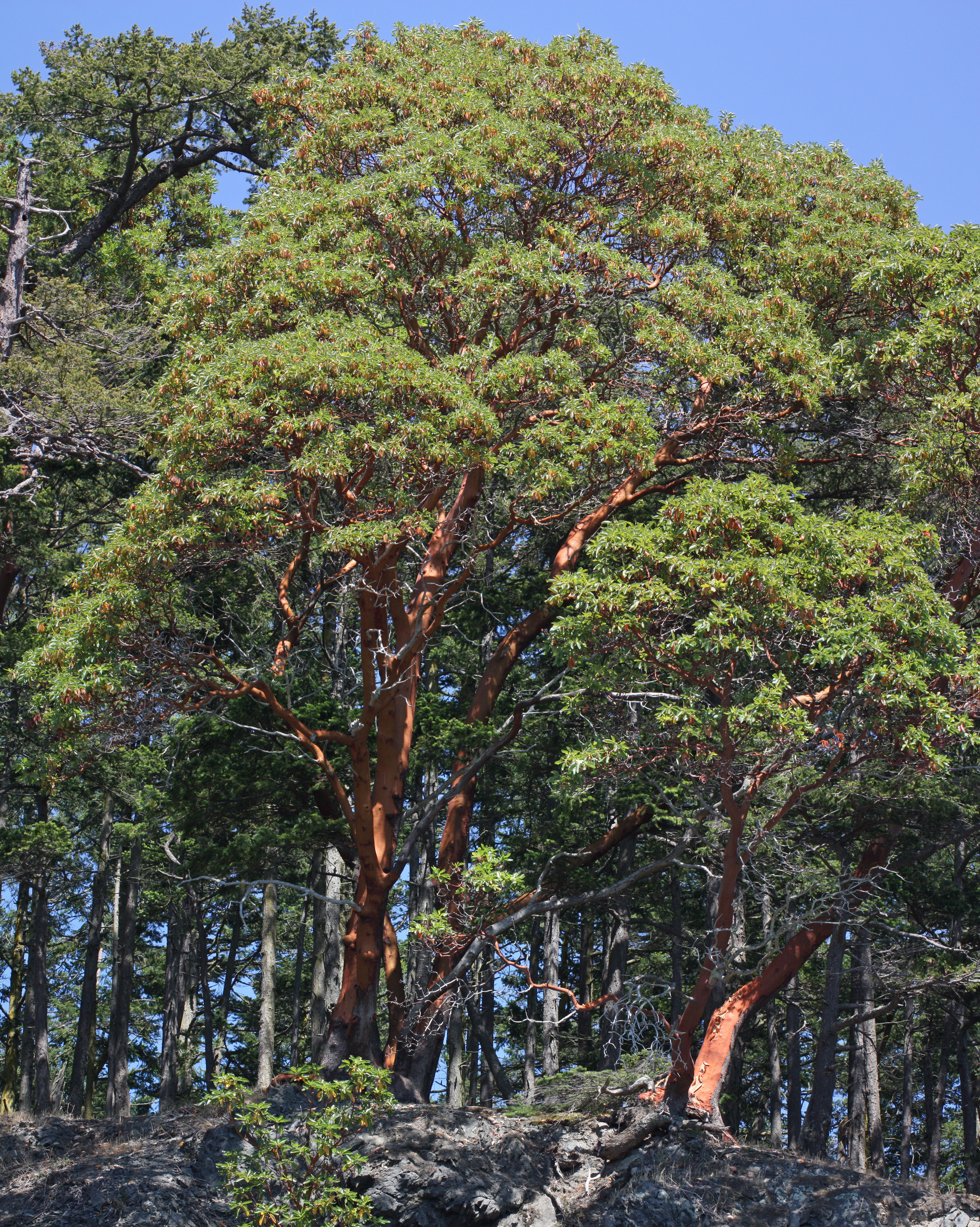
Mature trees at Deception Pass State Park

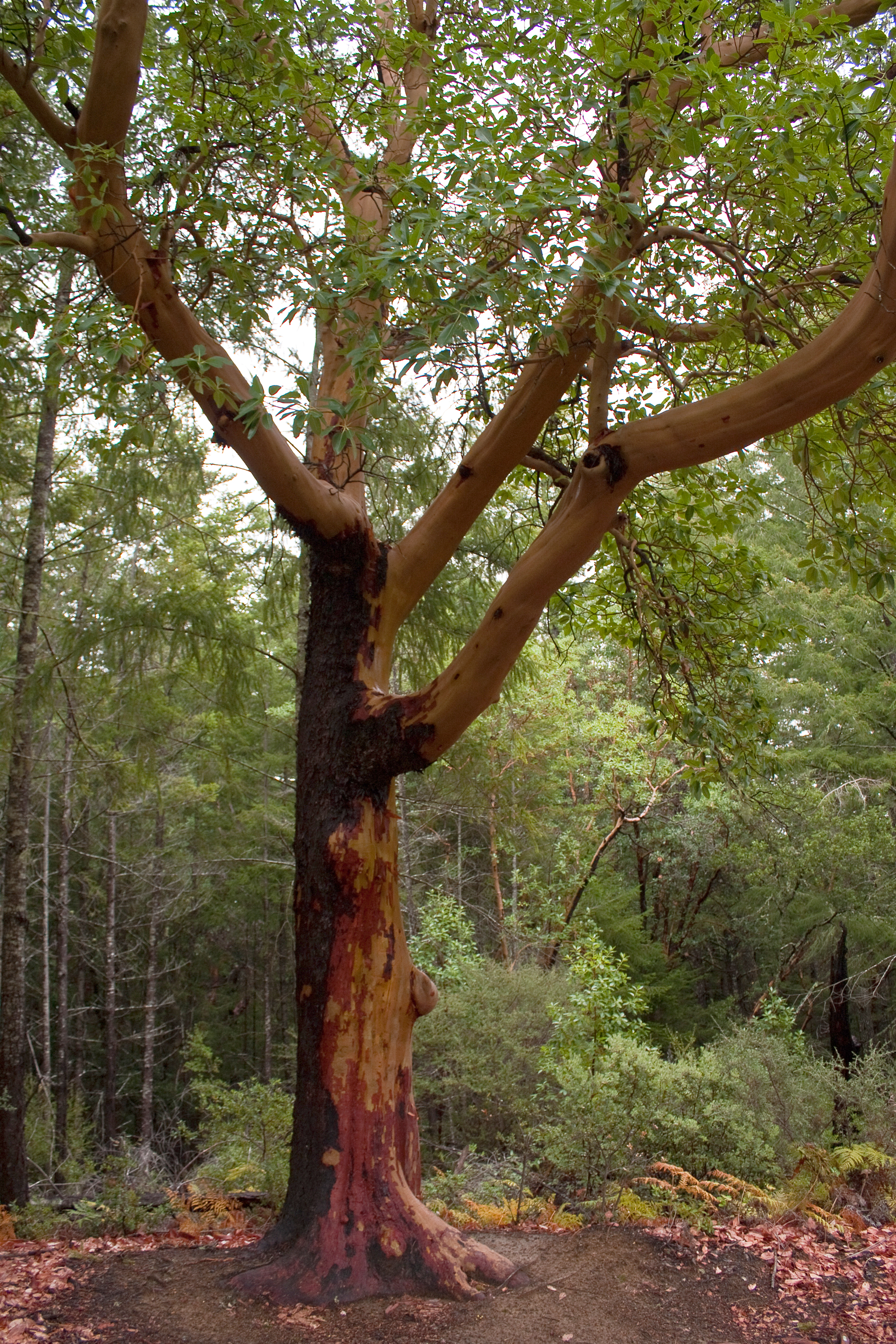
Mature tree at Big Basin Redwoods State Park, California
