= Neofusicoccum =

Scientific classification
- Kingdom: Fungi
- Division: Ascomycota
- Class: Dothideomycetes
- Order: Botryosphaeriales
- Family: Botryosphaeriaceae
- Genus: Neofusicoccum; Crous, Slippers & A.J.L.Phillips (2006)

Type species
- Neofusicoccum parvum (Pennycook & Samuels) Crous, Slippers & A.J.L.Phillips (2006)

Species
- See text

Genus of fungi

Neofusicoccum is a genus of fungi in the family Botryosphaeriaceae.

== Species ==
- Neofusicoccum andinum
- Neofusicoccum arbuti
- Neofusicoccum australe
- Neofusicoccum carallia
- Neofusicoccum cordaticola
- Neofusicoccum corticosae
- Neofusicoccum eucalypticola
- Neofusicoccum eucalyptorum
- Neofusicoccum grevilleae
- Neofusicoccum kwambonambiense
- Neofusicoccum luteum
- Neofusicoccum macroclavatum
- Neofusicoccum mangiferae
- Neofusicoccum mediterraneum
- Neofusicoccum nonquaesitum
- Neofusicoccum occulatum
- Neofusicoccum parvum
- Neofusicoccum pennatisporum
- Neofusicoccum protearum
- Neofusicoccum ribis
- Neofusicoccum umdonicola
- Neofusicoccum viticlavatum
- Neofusicoccum vitifusiforme
