= Celotheliaceae =

Scientific classification
- Kingdom: Fungi
- Division: Ascomycota
- Class: Eurotiomycetes
- Order: Phaeomoniellales; K.H.Chen, A.E.Arnold, Gueidan & Lutzoni (2015)
- Family: Celotheliaceae; Lücking, Aptroot & Sipman (2008)

Synonyms
- Phaeomoniellaceae P.M.Kirk (2015)

Family of lichen-forming fungi

Celotheliaceae is a family of fungi in the monotypic order Phaeomoniellales. It contains 27 species of crustose lichens with thalli that are more or less immersed in tree bark.

== Taxonomy ==
The family was proposed in 2008 by Robert Lücking, André Aptroot, and Harrie Sipman, while the order was circumscribed in 2015. It is sister to the clade that includes the orders Verrucariales and Chaetothyriales. Molecular clock calculations suggest that the order originated when gymnosperm diversification occurred.

The family Phaeomoniellaceae was proposed by Paul Kirk in 2015, using a reference to the description of the order Phaeomoniellales, circumscribed earlier that year. However, because Celothelium (the type genus of Celotheliaceae) is also included in the circumscription of the Phaeomoniellaceae, the older family name takes precedence and consequently, Phaeomoniellaceae is an illegitimate name according to nomenclatural rules; it is placed in synonymy with Celotheliaceae.

== Description ==
The family Celotheliaceae contains crustose lichens that are mostly immersed in bark, with some showing a prothallus. The photobiont is chlorococcoid (sometimes from genus Trentepohlia), with its filaments intermingling with bark cells beneath the substrate surface. Their ascomata are perithecia, which are black, range from circular to elongated, and can be either immersed or superficial. These perithecia, either solitary or in groups, are covered by a carbonised (blackened) involucrellum with individual ostioles, and are clypeate in shape. The exciple, transitioning in colour from pale to dark brown, blends with the involucrellum, but appears colourless and subtle beneath the asci.

The hamathecium (sterile cells and tissue in the hymenium) consists of a network of branched and interconnected paraphysoids, lacking periphyses, and a hymenial gel that does not turn deep blue when stained with iodine. Asci are typically eight-spored, narrowly elongate-cylindrical, fissitunicate in form and occasionally have a small internal apical rostrum (beak-like structure). The asci are often topped with a meniscus that is visible in Congo red and Lactophenol cotton blue stains. Ascospores are uniquely entwined or helically coiled, very long, filiform, colourless, and multiseptate with pointed ends. For conidiomata, which are pycnidial or stromatic, they can be either immersed or superficial, and are dark brown to black. Conidiogenous cells are elongate-bottle-shaped, lining the conidiomatal cavity, while the conidia are thread-like, colourless, and have multiple septa. Chemically, an unidentified yellow pigment has been observed on the exciple of Celothelium lutescens when treated with a solution of potassium hydroxide (K).

== Genera ==
These are the genera that are in the Phaeomoniellaceae (including estimated number of species in each genus, totalling 27 species), according to a 2021 review of fungal classification. Following the genus name is the taxonomic authority (those who first circumscribed the genus; standardised author abbreviations are used), year of publication, and the estimated number of species.

- Aequabiliella Crous (2015) – 1 sp.
- Celerioriella Crous (2015) – 3 spp.
- Celothelium A.Massal. (1860) – 8 spp.
- Minutiella Crous (2015) – 1 sp.
- Moristroma A.I.Romero & Samuels (1991) – 4 spp.
- Neophaeomoniella Rooney-Latham & Crous (2015) – 3 spp.
- Nothophaeomoniella Crous (2021) – 1 sp.
- Paraphaeomoniella Crous (2015) – 1 sp.
- Phaeomoniella Crous & W.Gams (2000) – 2 spp.
- Pseudophaeomoniella Nigro, Antelmi & Crous (2015) – 2 spp.
- Xenocylindrosporium Crous & Verkley (2009) – 1 sp.

Sesquiterpenes and polyketides metabolites are found in Picea rubens endophytes Phaemoniella.
