= Togniniaceae =

Scientific classification
- Kingdom: Fungi
- Division: Ascomycota
- Class: Sordariomycetes
- Subclass: Diaporthomycetidae
- Order: Togniniales; Senan., Maharachch. & K.D. Hyde (2015)
- Family: Togniniaceae; Réblová, L. Mostert, W. Gams & Crous (2004)

Type genus
- Togninia Berl. (1900)

Family of fungi

Togniniaceae is family of fungi in the order Togniniales.

== Genera ==
As accepted by Wijayawardene et al. 2020;

- Phaeoacremonium W.Gams, Crous & M.J.Wingf. - 65 sp.

Note; Species Fungorum lists 68 species of Phaeoacremonium.

Formerly listed Conidiotheca tympanoides (M.E. Barr) Réblová & L. Mostert (2007) now placed in the Xylariales order.
