= Fomitiporia mediterranea =

Scientific classification
- Kingdom: Fungi
- Division: Basidiomycota
- Class: Agaricomycetes
- Order: Hymenochaetales
- Family: Hymenochaetaceae
- Genus: Fomitiporia
- Species: F. mediterranea

Binomial name
- Fomitiporia mediterranea M.Fisch. 2002

Species of fungus

Fomitiporia mediterranea is a fungus species in the genus Fomitiporia associated with esca of grapevine. Further studies have characterised it as a serious pathogen attacking a wide range of citrus fruit when grafted on to bitter orange rootstocks such as the sweet orange, lemon and the Mandarin orange.

It can also attack the kiwifruit vine and olive.

Since sodium arsenite is no longer available as a fungicide, control of infection is problematical, with preliminary reports of inhibitory effects of Eucalyptus oil and selected bacteria.
