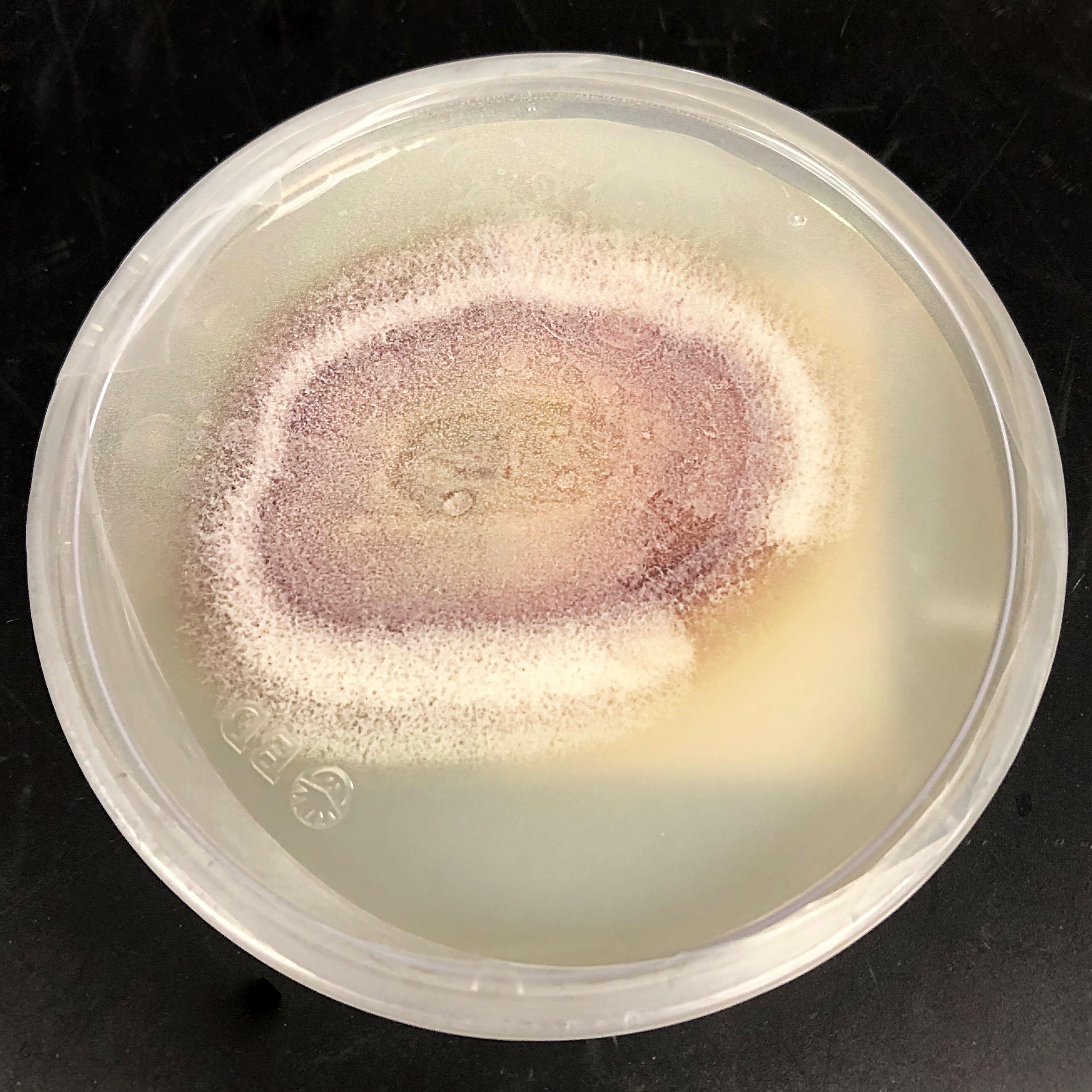
- Phaeoacremonium tardicrescens

Scientific classification
- Kingdom: Fungi
- Division: Ascomycota
- Class: Sordariomycetes
- Order: Togniniales
- Family: Togniniaceae
- Genus: Phaeoacremonium; W. Gams, Crous & M.J. Wingf.

Type species
- Phaeoacremonium parasitica

Species
- See text

= Phaeoacremonium =

Genus of fungi

Phaeoacremonium is a fungus genus associated with wilt and decline diseases of woody hosts and human infections.

Togninia is the teleomorph (the sexual reproductive stage) of Phaeoacremonium.

== Species ==
- Phaeoacremonium aleophilum, associated with esca in mature grapevines and decline in young vines (Petri disease), two types of grapevine trunk disease.
- Phaeoacremonium alvesii, a cause of subcutaneous infection of humans
- Phaeoacremonium amstelodamense, a cause of human joint infection
- Phaeoacremonium australiense, an endophyte of grapevines
- Phaeoacremonium griseorubrum, a cause of human fungemia (blood infection)
- Phaeoacremonium krajdenii, a cause of subcutaneous infection of humans
- Phaeoacremonium ovali, a freshwater species from Yunnan province, China
- Phaeoacremonium parasitica, formerly Phialophora parasitica
- Phaeoacremonium scolyti, an endophyte of grapevine, also isolated from bark beetle larvae
- Phaeoacremonium sphinctrophorum, from fungal cyst of the human foot
- Phaeoacremonium subulatum, an endophyte of grapevine
- Phaeoacremonium tardicrescens, from unspecified human medical source
- Phaeoacremonium theobromatis, from stem of wild mountain cocoa (Theobroma gileri) in Ecuador
- Phaeoacremonium venezuelense, from eumycetoma of the human foot
