= Esca (grape disease) =

Fungal grapevine trunk disease

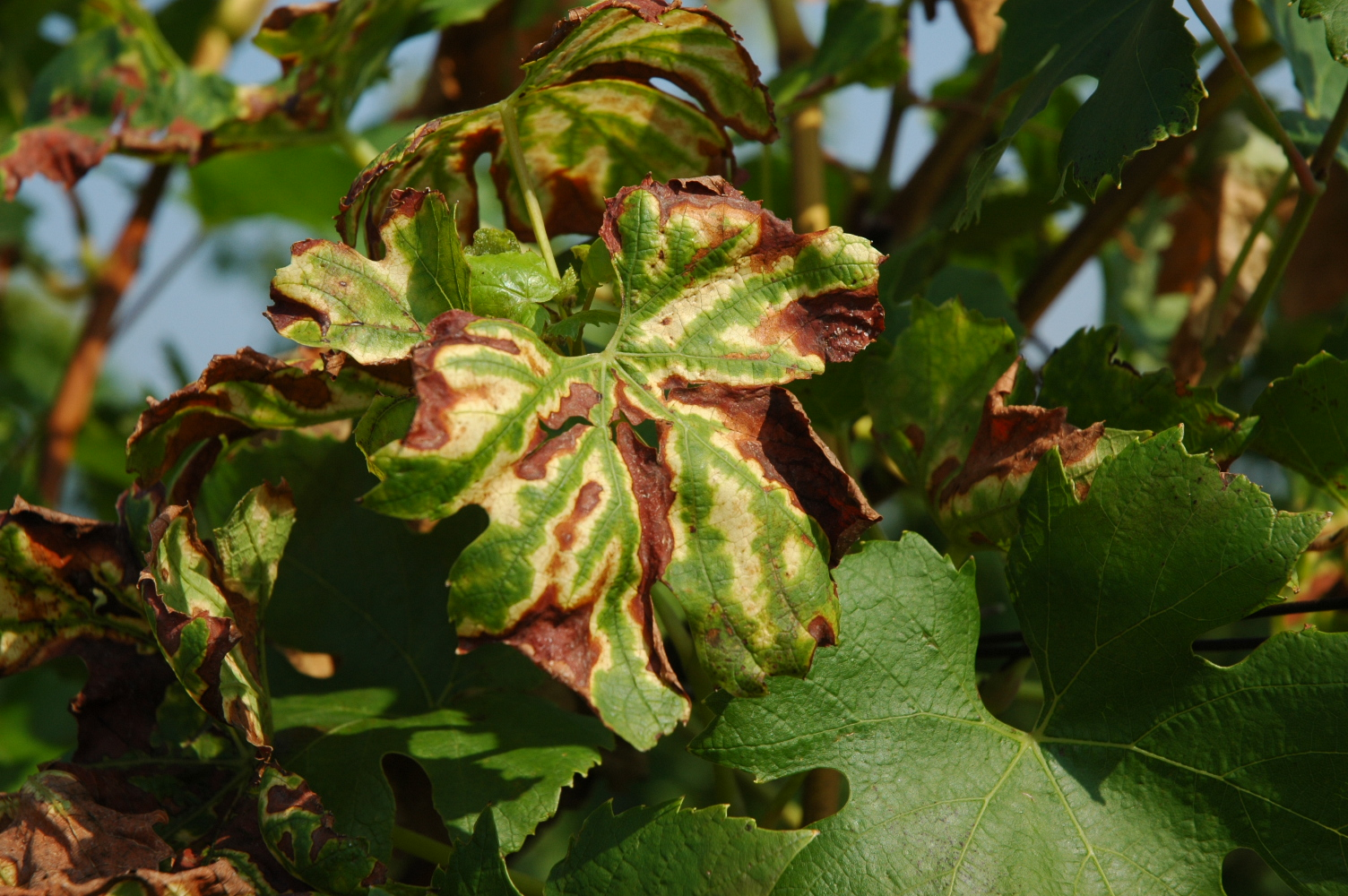
- Esca symptoms on leaves
- Causal agents: Phaeoacremonium aleophilum, Phaeomoniella chlamydospora
- Hosts: Vitis vinifera
- EPPO Code: TOGNMI, PHMOCH

Esca is a grape disease of mature grapevines. It is a type of grapevine trunk disease.

The fungi Phaeoacremonium aleophilum, Phaeomoniella chlamydospora and Fomitiporia mediterranea are associated with the disease.

== See also ==
- List of grape diseases
