= Fomitiporia nobilissima =

Scientific classification
- Domain: Eukaryota
- Kingdom: Fungi
- Division: Basidiomycota
- Class: Agaricomycetes
- Order: Hymenochaetales
- Family: Hymenochaetaceae
- Genus: Fomitiporia
- Species: F. nobilissima

Binomial name
- Fomitiporia nobilissima Decock & Yombiyeni (2010)

Species of fungus

Fomitiporia nobilissima is a fungus in the family Hymenochaetaceae. Found in Gabon, it was described as new to science in 2010.
