= List of Uromyces species =

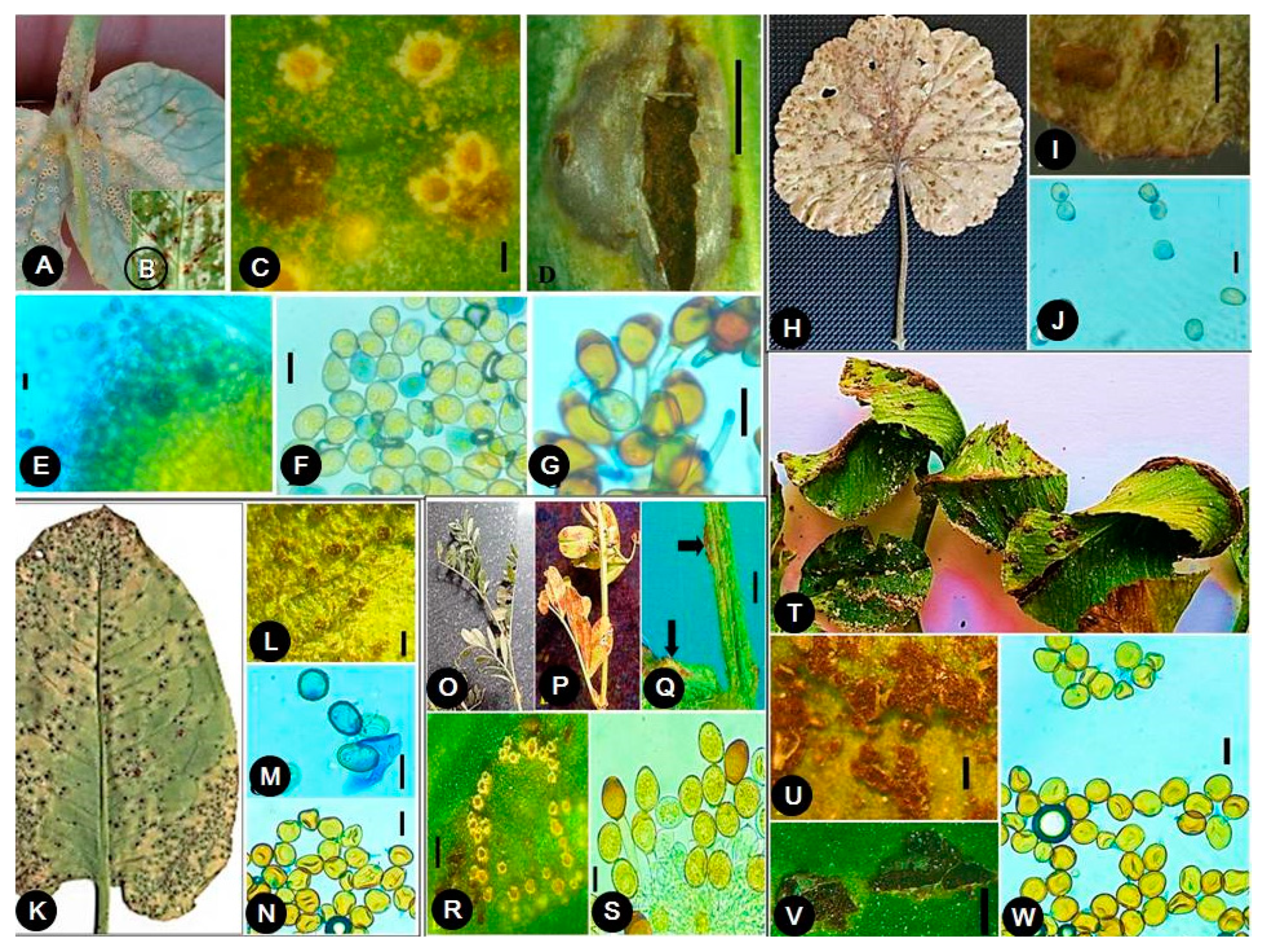
Uromyces species with some host plants, including Uromyces fabae on Pisum sativum (pea) and Uromyces viciae-fabae on Vicia faba

This is a list of the fungus species in the genus Uromyces. Many are plant pathogens. As of 2023 August 22, the GBIF lists up to 1,048 species, while Species Fungorum lists about 988 species (with many former species). The Encyclopedia of Life lists 969 species, and (ca. 1500) species are accepted by Wijayawardene et al. 2020.

This list with authors and dates is based on the Species Fungorum list of 988 names.

== A ==
- Uromyces abbreviatus Arthur (1915)
- Uromyces acantholimonis Syd. & P. Syd. (1906)
- Uromyces acetosae J. Schröt. (1876)
- Uromyces achrous Syd. & P. Syd. (1907)
- Uromyces aconiti Fuckel (1884)
- Uromyces aconiticola P. Zhao & L. Cai (2021)
- Uromyces aconiti-lycoctoni (DC.) G. Winter (1881)
- Uromyces acori T.S. Ramakr. & Rangaswami (1948)
- Uromyces actinostemonis H.S. Jacks. & Holw. (1931)
- Uromyces acuminatus Arthur (1883)
- Uromyces acutatus Fuckel (1870)
- Uromyces adelphicus Syd. (1935)
- Uromyces aecidiiformis (F. Strauss) C.C. Rees (1917)
- Uromyces aegopogonis Dietel & Holw. (1897)
- Uromyces aeluropodinus Tranzschel (1939)
- Uromyces aeluropodis-repentis Nattrass (1937)
- Uromyces aemulus Arthur (1911)
- Uromyces affinis G. Winter (1885)
- Uromyces agnatus Arthur (1911)
- Uromyces agropyri Barclay (1891)
- Uromyces agrostidis (Gonz. Frag.) A.L. Guyot (1938)
- Uromyces aimeae Berndt (2013)
- Uromyces airae-flexuosae Ferd. & Winge (1920)
- Uromyces albidus Kirgizb. (1986)
- Uromyces albiziae Henn. (1892)
- Uromyces albucae Kalchbr. & Cooke (1882)
- Uromyces albus (Clinton) Dietel & Holw. (1897)
- Uromyces algeriensis P. Syd. & Syd. (1910)
- Uromyces alhagi Szemb. (1915)
- Uromyces allii-monanthi Y. Harada (1985)
- Uromyces allii-sibirici Gjaerum (1970)
- Uromyces allii-victorialis Liou & Y.C. Wang (1935)
- Uromyces aloes (Cooke) Magnus (1892)
- Uromyces alopecuri Seym. (1889)
- Uromyces alpestris Tranzschel (1910)
- Uromyces alsines Tranzschel (1907)
- Uromyces alstroemeriae Henn. (1899)
- Uromyces alysicarpi Wakef. & Hansf. (1949)
- Uromyces alyxiae Arthur (1925)
- Uromyces amapaensis Sotão & Piovezan (2021)
- Uromyces ambiens Cooke (1874)
- Uromyces ambiguus (DC.) Niessl (1864)
- Uromyces americanus Speg. (1909)
- Uromyces amoenus Syd. & P. Syd. (1906)
- Uromyces amphidymus Syd. & P. Syd. (1906)
- Uromyces amphilophis-insculptae T.S. Ramakr., Sriniv. & Sundaram (1952)
- Uromyces amurensis Kom. (1898)
- Uromyces anabasis Kazenas (1959)
- Uromyces anagyridis Roum. (1880)
- Uromyces andropogonis Tracy (1893)
- Uromyces andropogonis-annulati Syd., P. Syd. & E.J. Butler (1907)
- Uromyces anguriae H.S. Jacks. & Holw. (1932)
- Uromyces anomathecae Cooke (1890)
- Uromyces anotidis Petch (1922)
- Uromyces anotidis-monospermatis T.S. Ramakr. & Sundaram (1955)
- Uromyces anthacanthi H.S. Jacks. (1924)
- Uromyces anthemophilus Vestergr. (1905)
- Uromyces antholyzae Syd. & P. Syd. (1904)
- Uromyces anthyllidis (Grev.) J. Schröt. (1875)
- Uromyces antiguanus Cummins (1940)
- Uromyces antioquiensis Mayor (1914)
- Uromyces antipae Săvul. & O. Săvul. (1968)
- Uromyces aphelandrae Syd. (1925)
- Uromyces apiosporus Hazsl. (1873)
- Uromyces apludae Syd., P. Syd. & E.J. Butler (1907)
- Uromyces appelianus Gassner (1922)
- Uromyces appendiculatus (Pers.) Steud. (1824)
- Uromyces aquiriensis Berndt (2013)
- Uromyces arasbaranensis M. Abbasi (2021)
- Uromyces araucanus Dietel & Neger (1897)
- Uromyces archerianus Arthur & Fromme (1915)
- Uromyces arenariae Tranzschel (1907)
- Uromyces arenariae-grandiflorae Mayor (1922)
- Uromyces argaeus Maire (1906)
- Uromyces argutus F. Kern (1911)
- Uromyces argyrolobii Doidge (1927)
- Uromyces ari-triphylli (Schwein.) Seeler (1942)
- Uromyces arizonicus Tracy & Galloway (1888)
- Uromyces armeriicola Speg. (1924)
- Uromyces asclepiadis Cooke (1877)
- Uromyces asperulae McAlpine (1895)
- Uromyces aspiliae H.S. Jacks. & Holw. (1932)
- Uromyces aspiliellus Vienn.-Bourg. (1952)
- Uromyces aspiliicola Cummins (1945)
- Uromyces astragali-alopecuri Gjaerum (1991)
- Uromyces astragali-atropilosuli Gjaerum (1991)
- Uromyces astragalicola Henn. (1898)
- Uromyces astragali-lasiosemi Vienn.-Bourg. (1952)
- Uromyces astragali-pseudoutrigeris Gjaerum (1991)
- Uromyces atlanticus Guyot & Malençon (1957)
- Uromyces atriplicis McAlpine (1906)
- Uromyces atropidis Tranzschel (1907)
- Uromyces aureus Dietel & Holw. (1893)
- Uromyces auriculae (Magnus) A. Buchheim (1924)
- Uromyces azorellae Cooke (1890)
- Uromyces azukiicola Hirata (1952)

== B ==
- Uromyces babianae Doidge (1927)
- Uromyces baccarinii Syd. & P. Syd. (1911)
- Uromyces badius Syd. (1924)
- Uromyces baeumlerianus Bubák (1908)
- Uromyces bahiensis Perd.-Sánch. (2014)
- Uromyces basellae Syd. & P. Syd. (1902)
- Uromyces bauhiniae Henn. (1895)
- Uromyces bauhiniicola Arthur (1905)
- Uromyces beckeropsidis E. Castell. (1947)
- Uromyces beckmanniae H.S. Jacks. (1918)
- Uromyces behenis (DC.) Unger (1836)
- Uromyces belemensis F.C. Albuq. & Figueiredo (1971)
- Uromyces beloperones G.F. Laundon (1963)
- Uromyces bermudianus Cummins (1941)
- Uromyces betae (Pers.) Tul. (1854)
- Uromyces bethelii Arthur (1924)
- Uromyces bicolor Ellis (1893)
- Uromyces bidenticola (Henn.) Arthur (1917)
- Uromyces bidentis Lagerh. (1895)
- Uromyces bisbyi Savile (1966)
- Uromyces blainvilleae Berk. (1873)
- Uromyces blandus Syd. (1931)
- Uromyces boissierae Vienn.-Bourg. (1958)
- Uromyces bolusii Massee (1901)
- Uromyces bomareae Henn. (1899)
- Uromyces bonaerensis Speg. (1880)
- Uromyces bonae-spei Bubák (1910)
- Uromyces bonaveriae P. Syd. (1899)
- Uromyces borealis Peck (1881)
- Uromyces bornmuelleri Magnus (1893)
- Uromyces borreriae Henn. (1896)
- Uromyces bosseri Vienn.-Bourg. (1963)
- Uromyces bothriochloae-intermediae Gorlenko (1970)
- Uromyces bouvardiae Syd. & P. Syd. (1903)
- Uromyces bradburyae H.S. Jacks. & Holw. (1931)
- Uromyces brandzae Săvul. (1939)
- Uromyces brasilianus Speg. (1912)
- Uromyces brasiliensis Trotter (1904)
- Uromyces bravensis Cummins (1964)
- Uromyces bresadolae Tranzschel (1910)
- Uromyces briardii Har. (1892)
- Uromyces brizae Gäum., E. Müll. & Terrier (1957)
- Uromyces brodiaeae Ellis & Harkn. (1884)
- Uromyces bromicola Arthur & Holw. (1925)
- Uromyces brominus Gucevič (1952)
- Uromyces buforrestiae Cummins (1960)
- Uromyces bugranae A.L. Guyot (1951)
- Uromyces bulbinicola Doidge (1927)
- Uromyces bulbinus Thüm. (1877)
- Uromyces bunsteri (Neger) H.S. Jacks. & Holw. (1926)
- Uromyces bupleuri Magnus (1899)
- Uromyces bylianus Doidge (1927)

== C ==
- Uromyces cacaliae (DC.) Unger (1836)
- Uromyces cacciniae Jørst. (1961)
- Uromyces cachrydis Har. (1891)
- Uromyces caladii (Schwein.) Farl. (1879)
- Uromyces calamagrostidis Uljan. (1959)
- Uromyces callicarpae (Petch) Fujik. ex S. Ito (1923)
- Uromyces calopogonii Cummins (1943)
- Uromyces calotheus Syd. (1937)
- Uromyces calycotomes Gäum. & Terrier (1950)
- Uromyces calystegiae de Bary ex Fuckel (1870)
- Uromyces camphorosmae (Castagne) Har. (1914)
- Uromyces canavaliae J.M. Yen (1976)
- Uromyces capensis Doidge (1927)
- Uromyces capitatus Syd. & P. Syd. (1902)
- Uromyces caraganae (Thüm.) Magnus (1905)
- Uromyces caraganicola Henn. (1901)
- Uromyces caricis-brunneae Morim. (1961)
- Uromyces caricis-dolichocarpae Azbukina (2005)
- Uromyces caricis-rafflesianae Mayor (1915)
- Uromyces caricis-schmidtii Tomilin (1964)
- Uromyces caricis-sempervirentis E. Fisch. (1898)
- Uromyces carneus (Nees) Har. (1893)
- Uromyces carpathicus Namysł. (1911)
- Uromyces carthagenensis Speg. (1898)
- Uromyces cassiae-mimosoidis (Doidge) Doidge (1948)
- Uromyces castaneus P. Syd. & Syd. (1909)
- Uromyces cayaponiae Henn. (1896)
- Uromyces cearensis Berndt & F.O. Freire (2007)
- Uromyces cedrelae (Henn.) Henn. (1907)
- Uromyces celosiae Dietel & Holw. (1901)
- Uromyces celtidis Dietel (1907)
- Uromyces cenisiae A.L. Guyot (1951)
- Uromyces ceratocarpi Syd. & P. Syd. (1912)
- Uromyces cestricola Speg. (1912)
- Uromyces chaetobromi Gjaerum (1988)
- Uromyces chaetolimonis Korbonsk. (1951)
- Uromyces charmelii Liou (1929)
- Uromyces chenopodii J. Schröt. (1880)
- Uromyces chenopodii-fruticosi (DC.) M. Abbasi & Aime (2020)
- Uromyces chesneyae Tranzschel & Erem. (1939)
- Uromyces chevalieri A.L. Guyot (1947)
- Uromyces chilensis Dietel & Neger (1897)
- Uromyces chiovendae Bacc. (1916)
- Uromyces chloridis Doidge (1927)
- Uromyces chlorogali Dietel & Holw. (1893)
- Uromyces chorizanthis Ellis & Harkn. (1884)
- Uromyces christensenii J. Anikster & I. Wahl (1967)
- Uromyces chubutensis Speg. (1902)
- Uromyces ciceris-arietini (Grognot) Jacz. & G. Boyer (1894)
- Uromyces ciceris-soongaricae S. Ahmad (1961)
- Uromyces circinalis Kalchbr. & Cooke (1879)
- Uromyces circumscriptus Neger (1896)
- Uromyces cisneroanus Speg. (1880)
- Uromyces cladomanes Traverso (1921)
- Uromyces cladrastidis Kusano (1905)
- Uromyces clarus H.S. Jacks. & Holw. (1927)
- Uromyces clavatus Dietel (1897)
- Uromyces claytoniae Cooke & Peck (1878)
- Uromyces clignyi Pat. & Har. (1900)
- Uromyces clignyioides Gjaerum (1988)
- Uromyces clitoriae Arthur (1905)
- Uromyces clivalis Mitter (1935)
- Uromyces clutiae Kalchbr. & Cooke (1882)
- Uromyces cnidoscoli Henn. (1895)
- Uromyces cobresiae Korbonsk. (1951)
- Uromyces colchici Massee (1892)
- Uromyces collinus J.F. Hennen & Cummins (1973)
- Uromyces cologaniae Arthur (1905)
- Uromyces coloradensis Ellis & Everh. (1893)
- Uromyces columbianus Mayor (1913)
- Uromyces coluteae Arthur (1910)
- Uromyces combreti Thaung (1974)
- Uromyces comedens P. Syd. & Syd. (1909)
- Uromyces commelinae Cooke (1888)
- Uromyces compactus Peck (1882)
- Uromyces comptus P. Syd. & Syd. (1910)
- Uromyces congoensis Syd. & P. Syd. (1909)
- Uromyces conicus Jørst. (1956)
- Uromyces coordinatus Arthur (1921)
- Uromyces corallocarpi W.T. Dale (1955)
- Uromyces cordiae Henn. (1899)
- Uromyces coronatus Yoshin. (1907)
- Uromyces coronillae Vienn.-Bourg. (1950)
- Uromyces correntinus J.C. Lindq. (1952)
- Uromyces corrugatus Speg. (1909)
- Uromyces costaricensis Syd. (1925)
- Uromyces costesianus Speg. (1921)
- Uromyces crassipes Dietel & Neger (1899)
- Uromyces crassivertex Dietel (1903)
- Uromyces crepidis-fraasii Kaps.-Gotsi (1986)
- Uromyces cretensis Petr. (1943)
- Uromyces cristatus J. Schröt. & Niessl (1877)
- Uromyces cristulatus Tranzschel (1910)
- Uromyces croci Pass. ex G. Winter (1881)
- Uromyces crotalariae-nitens Salazar-Yepes & Buriticá (2008)
- Uromyces cruchetii Mayor (1914)
- Uromyces cruckshanksiae Cummins & Bonar (1941)
- Uromyces cucubali Hirats. & Hashioka (1935)
- Uromyces cucullatus Syd. & P. Syd. (1904)
- Uromyces cucumivorus Berndt (2013)
- Uromyces cuenodii Maire (1919)
- Uromyces cuspidatus G. Winter (1887)
- Uromyces cyanotidis Cummins (1941)
- Uromyces cyathulae Henn. (1893)
- Uromyces cyperi Henn. (1893)
- Uromyces cypericola Gjaerum (1990)
- Uromyces cyprius Vienn.-Bourg. (1969)
- Uromyces cystopiformis Lagerh. (1910)
- Uromyces cytisi J. Schröt. (1878)

== D ==
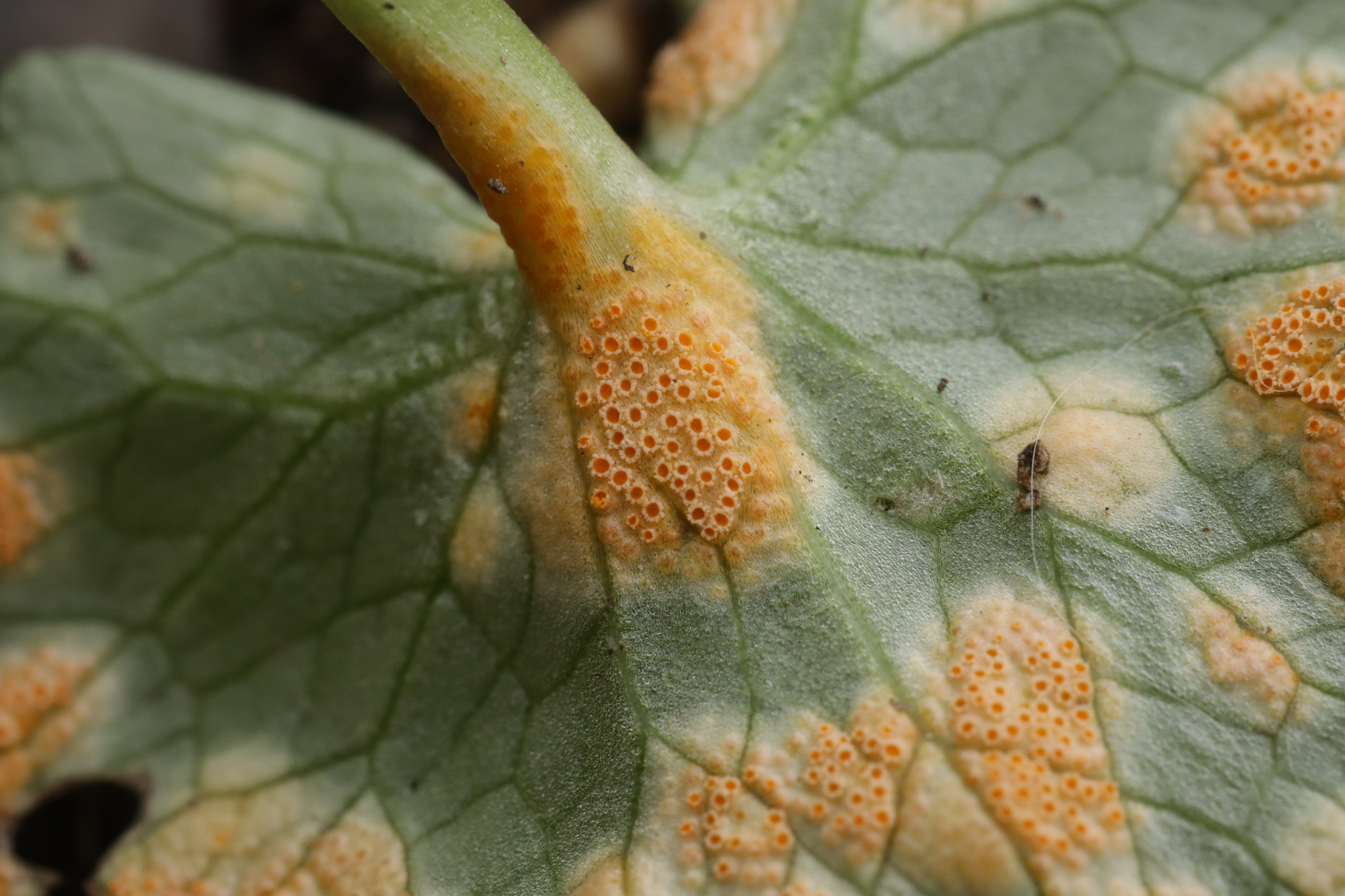
Uromyces dactylidis (celandine clustercup rust)

- Uromyces dactylidis G.H. Otth (1861)
- Uromyces dactyloctenii Wakef. & Hansf. (1949)
- Uromyces dactylocteniicola (Speg.) J.C. Lindq. (1943)
- Uromyces danthoniae McAlpine (1906)
- Uromyces decoratus Syd. & P. Syd. (1907)
- Uromyces deeringiae Syd. & P. Syd. (1903)
- Uromyces delagoensis Bubák (1910)
- Uromyces demetrionianus Pazschke (1895)
- Uromyces dendroseridis Keissl. (1927)
- Uromyces densus Arthur (1915)
- Uromyces desmodii Cooke (1878)
- Uromyces desmodiicola Jørst. (1959)
- Uromyces desmodii-leiocarpi Henn. (1908)
- Uromyces devoluensis Gäum. (1953)
- Uromyces dianthi (Pers.) Niessl (1872)
- Uromyces dianthi-caryophylli Monchot (1937)
- Uromyces dichromenae W.T. Dale (1955)
- Uromyces dictyospermae Ellis & Everh. ex Tranzschel (1910)
- Uromyces didymae Gapon. (1986)
- Uromyces dieramatis Doidge (1948)
- Uromyces dietelianus Pazschke (1891)
- Uromyces digitariae-adscendentis Y.C. Wang (1965)
- Uromyces dilucidus Cummins (1939)
- Uromyces diniensis A.L. Guyot (1938)
- Uromyces dinteri Mennicken, W. Maier & Oberw. (2005)
- Uromyces dipcadi Gjaerum (1984)
- Uromyces discariae G. Cunn. (1923)
- Uromyces dispersus Hirats. f. (1943)
- Uromyces dobremezii Durrieu (1987)
- Uromyces doebbeleri Berndt (2004)
- Uromyces dolichi Cooke (1882)
- Uromyces dolicholi Arthur (1906)
- Uromyces dolichosporus Dietel & Holw. (1901)
- Uromyces doricus Maire (1930)
- Uromyces dorystaechadis Gjaerum & Bahç. (2004)
- Uromyces drimiopsidis Doidge (1941)
- Uromyces dubiosus Henn. (1895)
- Uromyces ducellieri Maire (1917)
- Uromyces dusenii Dietel & Neger (1899)

== E ==
- Uromyces echinodes Kunze ex Henn. (1897)
- Uromyces ecklonii Bubák (1910)
- Uromyces eclipsis Berndt (2009)
- Uromyces edwardsiae G. Cunn. (1924)
- Uromyces ehrhartae McAlpine (1906)
- Uromyces ehrhartae-giganteae Doidge (1927)
- Uromyces elegans (Berk. & M.A. Curtis) Lagerh. (1895)
- Uromyces eleocharidis Arthur (1906)
- Uromyces ellipticus Dietel & Neger (1896)
- Uromyces ellisianus Henn. (1898)
- Uromyces emmeorhizae Syd. (1930)
- Uromyces epicampis Dietel & Holw. (1897)
- Uromyces eragrostidicola Gjaerum (1988)
- Uromyces eragrostidis Tracy (1893)
- Uromyces eriochloae (Syd. & P. Syd.) Syd., P. Syd. & E.J. Butler (1907)
- Uromyces eriogoni Ellis & Harkn. (1884)
- Uromyces eriospermi Kalchbr. & Cooke (1882)
- Uromyces ermelensis Doidge (1927)
- Uromyces ervi (Wallr.) Westend. (1854)
- Uromyces erythrinae Lagerh. (1910)
- Uromyces erythronii (DC.) Pass. (1867)
- Uromyces eugenei-mayorii M. Morelet (1969)
- Uromyces eulophiae Gjaerum (1984)
- Uromyces euphaeus Syd. (1937)
- Uromyces euphlebius Syd. & P. Syd. (1921)
- Uromyces euphorbiae Cooke & Peck (1873)
- Uromyces euphorbiae-connatae Speschnew (1901)
- Uromyces euphorbiae-javanicae E. Fisch. (1919)
- Uromyces euphorbiae-lunulatae Liou & Y.C. Wang (1935)
- Uromyces euphorbiae-nicaeensis Unamuno (1935)
- Uromyces euphorbiae-polytimeticae Zenkova (1963)
- Uromyces euphorbiicola (Berk. & M.A. Curtis) Tranzschel (1910)
- Uromyces eurotiae Tranzschel (1907)
- Uromyces euryopsidicola A.R. Wood & M. Scholler (2005)
- Uromyces evastigatus Cummins (1939)

== F ==
- Uromyces fallens (Desm.) Barthol. (1928)
- Uromyces fatouae Henn. (1902)
- Uromyces fedtschenkoi Faizieva (1986)
- Uromyces ferganensis Tranzschel & Erem. (1939)
- Uromyces ferrariae Doidge (1948)
- Uromyces ferulae Juel (1901)
- Uromyces ferulaginis Lindr. (1902)
- Uromyces festucae-nigricantis Gonz. Frag. (1914)
- Uromyces ficariae (Schumach.) Lév. (1860)
- Uromyces fiebrigii Henn. & Vestergr. (1905)
- Uromyces fiorianus Sacc. (1910)
- Uromyces fischerianus Mayor (1906)
- Uromyces fischeri-eduardi Magnus (1907)
- Uromyces flavicomae Liou (1929)
- Uromyces flemmingiae Henn. (1908)
- Uromyces fleuryae J.M. Yen (1973)
- Uromyces floralis Vestergr. (1905)
- Uromyces floscopae Syd. & P. Syd. (1916)
- Uromyces fontii Gonz. Frag. (1928)
- Uromyces formosus Syd. & P. Syd. (1908)
- Uromyces foveolatus Juel (1897)
- Uromyces fragilipes Tranzschel (1907)
- Uromyces fraserae Arthur & Ricker (1902)
- Uromyces fremonti Syd. & P. Syd. (1906)
- Uromyces fulgens Bubák (1907)
- Uromyces fuscatus Arthur (1918)

== G ==
- Uromyces gaeumannii Mayor & Vienn.-Bourg. (1949)
- Uromyces gageae Beck (1881)
- Uromyces galactiae Rezende & Dianese (2003)
- Uromyces galegae Sacc. (1874)
- Uromyces galegicola Woron. (1927)
- Uromyces galii Dietel (1907)
- Uromyces galii-californici Linder (1939)
- Uromyces galphimiae Dietel & Holw. (1897)
- Uromyces garanbiensis (Hirats. f. & Hashioka) Sawada (1943)
- Uromyces gaubae Petr. (1953)
- Uromyces gausseni Mayor & Vienn.-Bourg. (1949)
- Uromyces geissorhizae Henn. (1900)
- Uromyces gemmatus Berk. & M.A. Curtis (1868)
- Uromyces genistae Fuckel (1870)
- Uromyces gentianae Arthur (1891)
- Uromyces geranii (DC.) G.H. Otth & Wartm. (1847)
- Uromyces geraniicola Speg. (1924)
- Uromyces ghaznicus Petr. (1963)
- Uromyces giganteus Speg. (1879)
- Uromyces gigantiformis Salazar-Yepes & Buriticá (2008)
- Uromyces gilgitae S. Ahmad (1961)
- Uromyces gladioli Henn. (1895)
- Uromyces globosus Dietel & Holw. (1897)
- Uromyces glyceriae Arthur (1910)
- Uromyces glycyrrhizae (Rabenh.) Magnus (1890)
- Uromyces gnaphalii Ellis & Everh. (1893)
- Uromyces gouaniae F. Kern (1911)
- Uromyces goyazensis Henn. (1895)
- Uromyces graminis (Niessl) Dietel (1892)
- Uromyces grandiotii Gäum. (1936)
- Uromyces greenstockii Doidge (1927)
- Uromyces guatemalensis Vestergr. (1905)
- Uromyces guayacuru Speg. (1881)
- Uromyces gueldenstaedtiae Liou & Y.C. Wang (1935)
- Uromyces guerkeanus Henn. (1893)
- Uromyces guraniae Mayor (1914)
- Uromyces gypsophilae Cooke (1880)

== H ==
- Uromyces habrochloae Gjaerum (1988)
- Uromyces hainanicus J.Y. Zhuang & S.X. Wei (1999)
- Uromyces halimodendri Solkina (1928)
- Uromyces handelii Bubák (1914)
- Uromyces haraeanus Syd. & P. Syd. (1912)
- Uromyces hardenbergiae McAlpine (1906)
- Uromyces hariotianus Lagerh. (1918)
- Uromyces harmsianus (Henn.) Doidge (1927)
- Uromyces haussknechtii Tranzschel (1910)
- Uromyces hawksworthii É.S.C. Souza, Z.M. Chaves, W.R.O. Soares, Pinho & Dianese (2015)
- Uromyces hedysari-obscuri (DC.) Carestia & Picc. (1871)
- Uromyces hedysari-paniculati (Schwein.) Farl. (1879)
- Uromyces heimerlianus Magnus (1907)
- Uromyces heimii Mayor & Vienn.-Bourg. (1949)
- Uromyces helichrysi Lagerh. (1899)
- Uromyces heliotropii Sred. (1896)
- Uromyces hellebori-thibetani J.Y. Zhuang & S.X. Wei (2003)
- Uromyces hemmendorfii Vestergr. (1905)
- Uromyces hermonis Magnus (1899)
- Uromyces herterianus Dietel (1937)
- Uromyces hessii Berndt (2020)
- Uromyces heterantherae (Henn.) P. Syd. & Syd. (1910)
- Uromyces heterodermus Syd. & P. Syd. (1906)
- Uromyces heterogeneus Cooke (1876)
- Uromyces heteromallus Syd. (1939)
- Uromyces heteromorphae Thüm. (1877)
- Uromyces hewittiae Syd. & P. Syd. (1906)
- Uromyces hidakaensis Muray. & Takeuchi (1955)
- Uromyces himalaicus Y. Ono, Adhikari & Rajbh. (1988)
- Uromyces hippocrepidis Syd. & P. Syd. (1921)
- Uromyces hippomarathri Lindr. (1901)
- Uromyces hippomarathricola Sousa da Câmara (1936)
- Uromyces hobsonii Vize (1876)
- Uromyces holci Jørst. (1957)
- Uromyces holubii Doidge (1941)
- Uromyces holwayi Lagerh. (1889)
- Uromyces hordeastri A.L. Guyot (1938)
- Uromyces houstoniatus (Schwein.) J. Sheld. (1909)
- Uromyces howei (Peck) De Toni (1878)
- Uromyces huallagensis Henn. (1904)
- Uromyces hyacinthi W. Schneid. (1927)
- Uromyces hyalinus Peck (1878)
- Uromyces hybridi W.H. Davis (1924)
- Uromyces hyderabadensis Ramachar, K.N. Rao & Bagyan. (1987)
- Uromyces hydrocotylicola J.Y. Zhuang (1986)
- Uromyces hymenocarpi Jaap (1915)
- Uromyces hyparrheniae Gjaerum (1983)
- Uromyces hyparrheniicola Gjaerum (1988)
- Uromyces hyperici (Schwein.) M.A. Curtis (1867)
- Uromyces hyperici-frondosi (Schwein.) Arthur (1883)
- Uromyces hypericinus Speg. (1909)
- Uromyces hypoestis Tarr & G.F. Laundon (1963)
- Uromyces hypsophilus Speg. (1902)

== I ==
- Uromyces ictericus Cummins (1941)
- Uromyces ignobilis (Syd. & P. Syd.) Arthur (1915)
- Uromyces illotus Arthur & Holw. (1918)
- Uromyces imperfectus Arthur (1920)
- Uromyces inaequialtus Lasch (1859)
- Uromyces inayatii Syd. & P. Syd. (1907)
- Uromyces indicus Pat. (1886)
- Uromyces indigoferae Dietel & Holw. (1901)
- Uromyces induratus Syd., P. Syd. & Holw. (1903)
- Uromyces infarctus Berndt (2013)
- Uromyces inflatus (Cooke) McKenzie (2008)
- Uromyces ingicola Henn. (1904)
- Uromyces ingiphilus Speg. (1925)
- Uromyces insignis P. Syd. & Syd. (1909)
- Uromyces insularis Arthur (1906)
- Uromyces intricatus Cooke (1878)
- Uromyces invisus (Speg.) Speg. (1925)
- Uromyces ipatingae F.A. Ferreira & Y. Hirats. (1999)e
- Uromyces iranensis M. Abbasi (2021)
- Uromyces iresines Lagerh. (1910)
- Uromyces isachnes Petch (1917)
- Uromyces itoanus Hirats. f. (1935)
- Uromyces ixiae (Lév.) G. Winter (1884)

== J ==
- Uromyces jacksonii Arthur & Fromme (1915)
- Uromyces jamaicensis Vestergr. (1905)
- Uromyces janiphae (G. Winter) Arthur (1915)
- Uromyces jatrophae Dietel & Holw. (1897)
- Uromyces jatrophicola Henn. (1908)
- Uromyces joffrinii Delacr. (1902)
- Uromyces johowii Dietel & Neger (1896)
- Uromyces jonesii Peck (1882)
- Uromyces jordianus Bubák (1905)
- Uromyces junci Tul. (1854)
- Uromyces juncicola Speg. (1909)
- Uromyces junci-effusi P. Syd. & Syd. (1910)
- Uromyces juncinus Thüm. (1879)

== K ==
- Uromyces kaernbachii Henn. (1892)
- Uromyces kaimontanus Hirats. f. & S. Sato (1959)
- Uromyces kalmusii Sacc. (1880)
- Uromyces karjaginii Uljan. (1959)
- Uromyces kaviriae M. Abbasi (2021)
- Uromyces kawakamii Syd. & P. Syd. (1914)
- Uromyces kentaniensis Doidge (1927)
- Uromyces kenyensis J.F. Hennen (1956)
- Uromyces kigesianus Cummins (1952)
- Uromyces kisantuensis Henn. (1907)
- Uromyces klebahnii E. Fisch. (1914)
- Uromyces klotzschianus B. Ali (2019)
- Uromyces kochiae Syd. & P. Syd. (1912)
- Uromyces kochianus Gäum. (1933)
- Uromyces koeleriae Uljan. (1959)
- Uromyces komarowii Bubák (1902)
- Uromyces kondoi Miura (1928)
- Uromyces krameriae Arthur (1918)
- Uromyces krantzbergensis Doidge (1949)
- Uromyces kunigamiensis Shimab. (1960)
- Uromyces kurtzii Henn. (1894)
- Uromyces kwangensis Henn. (1907)
- Uromyces kwangsianus Cummins (1957)

== L ==
- Uromyces lachenaliae Doidge (1927)
- Uromyces laevigatus Syd. & P. Syd. (1912)
- Uromyces laevis Körn. (1877)
- Uromyces langtangensis Durrieu (1987)
- Uromyces lapeyrousiae Petr. (1959)
- Uromyces lapponicus Lagerh. (1890)
- Uromyces largus Arthur & Cummins (1933)
- Uromyces laserpitii-graminis E. Fisch. (1906)
- Uromyces lasiocorydis Henn. (1893)
- Uromyces lathyrinus Speg. (1881)
- Uromyces latimammatus J.Y. Zhuang & S.X. Wei (2011)
- Uromyces lazistanicus Petr. (1942)
- Uromyces lenticola Petr. (1953)
- Uromyces leonotidis Bagyan., Gjaerum & M. Raju (2003)
- Uromyces leptaleus Syd. (1931)
- Uromyces leptochloae Wakef. (1949)
- Uromyces lereddei Dupias (1953)
- Uromyces lespedezae (Thüm.) Peck (1879)
- Uromyces lespedezae-bicoloris F.L. Tai & C.C. Cheo (1937)
- Uromyces lespedezae-macrocarpae Liou & Y.C. Wang (1935)
- Uromyces lespedezae-procumbentis (Schwein.) Lagerh. (1867)
- Uromyces lespedezae-sericeae S. Ahmad (1956)
- Uromyces libycus Trotter (1912)
- Uromyces ligulariae Hirats. & Hoshioka (1934)
- Uromyces limonii-caroliniani Savile & Conners (1951)
- Uromyces limosellae F. Ludw. (1889)
- Uromyces lineolatus (Desm.) J. Schröt. (1876)
- Uromyces loculatus Cummins (1960)
- Uromyces loculiformis T.S. Ramakr. & K. Ramakr. (1948)
- Uromyces lomandracearum J. Walker & van der Merwe (2009)
- Uromyces longipedicellaris Ramachar & A.Sudh. Rao (1985)
- Uromyces longipes (Lasch) Tranzschel (1939)
- Uromyces loranthi H.S. Jacks. (1927)
- Uromyces lotononidicola Berndt (2006)
- Uromyces lugubris Kalchbr. (1882)
- Uromyces lupini Berk. & M.A. Curtis (1860)
- Uromyces lupinicola Bubák (1902)
- Uromyces lychnidis Tracy & Earle (1895)
- Uromyces lygei P. Syd. & Syd. (1910)

== M ==
- Uromyces macounianus Ellis & Everh. (1893)
- Uromyces macowanii Bubák (1902)
- Uromyces magnatus (Arthur) Arthur (1917)
- Uromyces magnusii Kleb. (1913)
- Uromyces maireanus P. Syd. & Syd. (1910)
- Uromyces major Arthur (1911)
- Uromyces malloti Henn. (1892)
- Uromyces mangenotii Mayor & Vienn.-Bourg. (1949)
- Uromyces manihoticola Henn. (1895)
- Uromyces manihotis Henn. (1895)
- Uromyces manihotis-catingae Henn. (1908)
- Uromyces marinus Guyot & Malençon (1957)
- Uromyces martinii Farl. (1883)
- Uromyces massoniae Doidge (1939)
- Uromyces matinae M. Abbasi (2021)
- Uromyces mayorii Tranzschel (1913)
- Uromyces mbelensis Henn. (1907)
- Uromyces mcnabbii Cummins (1971)
- Uromyces megalosporus Speg. (1898)
- Uromyces melandrii Dietel & Neger (1897)
- Uromyces melantherae Cooke (1882)
- Uromyces melasphaerulae Syd. & P. Syd. (1904)
- Uromyces melothriae Henn. (1893)
- Uromyces menyanthis Azbukina & Zenkova (1966)
- Uromyces mercurialis Henn. (1902)
- Uromyces mexicanus Dietel & Holw. (1897)
- Uromyces meygounensis Petr. (1955)
- Uromyces microchloae Syd. & P. Syd. (1903)
- Uromyces microsorus Kalchbr. & Cooke (1882)
- Uromyces microtidis Cooke (1885)
- Uromyces miersiae Gäum. (1936)
- Uromyces mikaniae Viégas (1945)
- Uromyces minimus Davis (1894)
- Uromyces minor J. Schröt. (1887)
- Uromyces minutus Dietel (1897)
- Uromyces miurae Syd. & P. Syd. (1913)
- Uromyces moehringiae S. Ito & Hirats. f. (1926)
- Uromyces moesiacus Lindtner & Vienn.-Bourg. (1959)
- Uromyces mogianensis Bubák (1902)
- Uromyces mongolicus U. Braun & G. Hirsch (1988)
- Uromyces monspessulanus Tranzschel (1910)
- Uromyces montanoae Arthur & Holw. (1918)
- Uromyces montanus Arthur (1905)
- Uromyces montis-ferrati Maire (1931)
- Uromyces moraeae Syd. & P. Syd. (1912)
- Uromyces mucunae Rabenh. (1878)
- Uromyces muhlenbergiae S. Ito (1909)
- Uromyces mulgedii Lindr. (1901)
- Uromyces mulini J. Schröt. (1896)
- Uromyces musae Henn. (1907)
- Uromyces muscari (Duby) Niessl (1864)
- Uromyces mussooriensis Syd. & P. Syd. (1906)
- Uromyces myosotidis Bahç. (2015)
- Uromyces myristicus Berk. & M.A. Curtis (1874)
- Uromyces myrsines Dietel (1897)
- Uromyces mysticus Arthur (1911)

== N ==
- Uromyces namaqualandus Mennicken, W. Maier & Oberw. (2005)
- Uromyces nassauviae J.C. Lindq. (1943)
- Uromyces nassellae Cummins (1956)
- Uromyces natalensis Magnus (1896)
- Uromyces natricis A.L. Guyot (1951)
- Uromyces nattrassii Cummins (1943)
- Uromyces naucinus Berndt (2013)
- Uromyces necopinus Cummins (1941)
- Uromyces neotropicalis J.R. Hern. & Aime (2005)
- Uromyces nerviphilus (Grognot) Hotson (1925)
- Uromyces nevadensis Harkn. (1884)
- Uromyces nidificans Tranzschel (1907)
- Uromyces nilagiricus T.S. Ramakr. & K. Ramakr. (1950)
- Uromyces niteroyensis Rangel (1917)
- Uromyces nordenskjoldii Dietel (1899)
- Uromyces notabilis Wakef. (1949)
- Uromyces nothoscordi Syd. & P. Syd. (1901)
- Uromyces novissimus Speg. (1880)
- Uromyces numidicus Maire (1931)
- Uromyces nyikensis Syd. & P. Syd. (1904)
- Uromyces nymphoidis Săvul. (1939)

== O ==
- Uromyces oaxacanus Dietel & Holw. (1901)
- Uromyces oberwinklerianus Berndt (2004)
- Uromyces obesus Durrieu (1987)
- Uromyces oblectaneus H.S. Jacks. & Holw. (1926)
- Uromyces oblongisporus Ellis & Everh. (1898)
- Uromyces oblongus Vize (1877)
- Uromyces obscurus Dietel & Holw. (1897)
- Uromyces occidentalis Dietel (1903)
- Uromyces occultus J.C. Lindq. (1951)
- Uromyces ocimi Hansf. (1949)
- Uromyces oedipus Dietel (1905)
- Uromyces oenotherae Burrill (1884)
- Uromyces oliveirae J. Anikster & I. Wahl (1967)
- Uromyces ononidis Pass. (1874)
- Uromyces ophiorrhizae Gäum. (1921)
- Uromyces orbicularis Dietel (1897)
- Uromyces orchidearum Cooke & Massee (1888)
- Uromyces orientalis Syd. & P. Syd. (1907)
- Uromyces ornatipes Arthur (1915)
- Uromyces ornithopodioides Gonz. Frag. (1913)
- Uromyces orobi-tuberosi (Pers.) Liro (1935)
- Uromyces orthosiphonis T.S. Ramakr. & Sriniv. (1950)
- Uromyces otakou G. Cunn. (1923)
- Uromyces otaviensis Mennicken, W. Maier & Oberw. (2005)
- Uromyces ovalis Dietel (1905)
- Uromyces ovirensis Jaap (1908)

== P ==
- Uromyces pachyceps Lagerh. (1910)
- Uromyces pallidus Niessl (1872)
- Uromyces panici-sanguinalis Rangel (1917)
- Uromyces pannosus Vestergr. (1905)
- Uromyces papillatus Kalchbr. & Cooke (1882)
- Uromyces paradoxus Syd. & P. Syd. (1909)
- Uromyces parilis Syd. (1935)
- Uromyces paspalicola Arthur & Holw. (1925)
- Uromyces paulshoekensis Mennicken, W. Maier & Oberw. (2005)
- Uromyces pavgii R.N. Goswami & Ngachan (1979)
- Uromyces pavoniae Arthur (1904)
- Uromyces pazschkeanus Henn. (1893)
- Uromyces peckianus Farl. (1883)
- Uromyces peglerae Pole-Evans (1914)
- Uromyces peireskiae Dietel (1899)
- Uromyces pencanus (Dietel & Neger) Arthur & Holw. (1925)
- Uromyces penniseti S. Ahmad (1961)
- Uromyces pentaceae D.K. Agarwal (2003)
- Uromyces pentaschistidis Gjaerum (1988)
- Uromyces peracarpae S. Ito & Tochinai (1926)
- Uromyces peraffinis Dietel (1922)
- Uromyces pereskiae H.S. Jacks. & Holw. (1931)
- Uromyces perigynius Halst. (1889)
- Uromyces perlebiae Vestergr. (1905)
- Uromyces permeritus Cummins (1940)
- Uromyces persicus Syd. & P. Syd. (1908)
- Uromyces petitmenginii Maire (1930)
- Uromyces phacae-frigidae (Wahlenb.) Har. (1893)
- Uromyces phalaridicola Katajev (1951)
- Uromyces phaseolicola Speg. (1909)
- Uromyces phlei-michelii Cruchet (1916)
- Uromyces phlogacanthi Gäum. (1922)
- Uromyces phtirusae Mayor (1914)
- Uromyces phyllachoroides Henn. (1901)
- Uromyces physanthyllidis Vienn.-Bourg. (1950)
- Uromyces phyteumatum (DC.) Niessl (1864)
- Uromyces pianhyensis Henn. (1908)
- Uromyces pictus Thüm. (1879)
- Uromyces pieningii Cummins (1960)
- Uromyces pisi-sativi (Pers.) Liro (1908)
- Uromyces pittospori Henn. (1891)
- Uromyces planiusculus (Mont.) Jørst. (1947)
- Uromyces plantaginis Vestergr. (1910)
- Uromyces plumbarius Peck (1879)
- Uromyces poae-alpinae Rytz (1910)
- Uromyces poinsettiae Tranzschel (1910)
- Uromyces poiretiae Syd. (1934)
- Uromyces polemanniae Kalchbr. & Cooke (1882)
- Uromyces poliotelis Syd. (1925)
- Uromyces politus (Berk.) McAlpine (1906)
- Uromyces polycnemi McAlpine (1906)
- Uromyces polygalae Grove (1916)
- Uromyces polygoni-avicularis (Pers.) G.H. Otth (1864)
- Uromyces polymniae (Henn.) Dietel & Holw. (1901)
- Uromyces polymorphus Peck & Clinton (1878)
- Uromyces polytriadicola Arthur & Cummins (1936)
- Uromyces pontederiae W.R. Gerard (1875)
- Uromyces pontederiicola Speg. (1925)
- Uromyces poonensis W.D. More & Moniz (1964)
- Uromyces porcensis Mayor (1914)
- Uromyces porosus (Peck) H.S. Jacks. (1918)
- Uromyces pozoae Dietel & Neger (1899)
- Uromyces prangi Har. (1900)
- Uromyces pratensis Juel (1905)
- Uromyces pratiae Speg. (1887)
- Uromyces pretoriensis Doidge (1927)
- Uromyces primaverilis Speg. (1881)
- Uromyces primulae-integrifoliae (DC.) Niessl (1872)
- Uromyces prismaticus Vienn.-Bourg. (1958)
- Uromyces privae Syd. & P. Syd. (1907)
- Uromyces probus Arthur (1911)
- Uromyces procerus J.C. Lindq. (1960)
- Uromyces propinquus P. Syd. & Syd. (1910)
- Uromyces prosopidis (Jacz.) Jacz. (1915)
- Uromyces pseudarthriae Cooke (1882)
- Uromyces psoraleae Peck (1881)
- Uromyces psychotriae Henn. (1904)
- Uromyces pteroclaenae Lindr. (1902)
- Uromyces pulchellus Ellis & Everh. (1895)
- Uromyces pulvinatus Kalchbr. & Cooke (1880)
- Uromyces punctiformis Syd. & P. Syd. (1901)
- Uromyces purpureus Lagerh. (1889)
- Uromyces pustulatus Wakef. (1922)
- Uromyces puttemansii Rangel (1917)
- Uromyces pyriformis Cooke (1878)

== Q ==
- Uromyces quaggafonteinus Mennicken & Oberw. (2004)
- Uromyces quinchamalii Neger (1896)

== R ==
- Uromyces ramacharii Ravinder & Bagyan. (1994)
- Uromyces ranunculi-distichophylli Semadeni (1906)
- Uromyces rapaneae Henn. (1908)
- Uromyces ratoides Jørst. (1956)
- Uromyces ratus H.S. Jacks. & Holw. (1932)
- Uromyces rayssiae J. Anikster & I. Wahl (1967)
- Uromyces rebeccae Bruckart, M. Abbasi & Aime (2020)
- Uromyces regius Vestergr. (1905)
- Uromyces reichei Dietel (1908)
- Uromyces reichertii J. Anikster & I. Wahl (1967)
- Uromyces renovatus P. Syd. & Syd. (1909)
- Uromyces reticulatus (Thüm.) Bubák (1902)
- Uromyces reynoldsii Thaung (2009)
- Uromyces rhinacanthi Cummins (1952)
- Uromyces rhodesicus Wakef. (1931)
- Uromyces rhynchosporae Ellis (1893)
- Uromyces ribicola H.S. Jacks. & Holw. (1931)
- Uromyces rickerianus Arthur (1902)
- Uromyces riloensis Hinkova (1963)
- Uromyces romuleae Van der Byl & Werderm. (1923)
- Uromyces rostratus Henn. (1896)
- Uromyces rottboelliae Arthur (1902)
- Uromyces rubidus Arthur & Holw. (1925)
- Uromyces rudbeckiae Arthur & Holw. (1885)
- Uromyces ruelliae Holw. (1904)
- Uromyces rugosus Arthur (1905)
- Uromyces rugulosus Pat. (1888)
- Uromyces ruiz-leali J.C. Lindq. (1949)
- Uromyces rumicis (Schumach.) G. Winter (1884)
- Uromyces rumicis-tingitani (DC.) Malençon (1946)
- Uromyces rzedowskii J.F. Hennen & Cummins (1973)

== S ==
- Uromyces sabineae Arthur (1917)
- Uromyces saginatus Syd. (1928)
- Uromyces sakawensis Henn. (1903)
- Uromyces salicorniae (DC.) de Bary (1870)
- Uromyces salmeae Arthur & Holw. (1918)
- Uromyces salpichroae H.S. Jacks. & Holw. (1932)
- Uromyces salsolae Rabenh. (1871)
- Uromyces sasaensis Gjaerum (1986)
- Uromyces satarensis P.B. Chavan & Bakare (1973)
- Uromyces saulensis Berndt (2013)
- Uromyces saururi Henn. (1902)
- Uromyces saussureae P. Karst. (1904)
- Uromyces savulescui Rayss (1937)
- Uromyces scaberulus L. Guo & Y.C. Wang (1987)
- Uromyces scaevolae G. Cunn. (1930)
- Uromyces schanginiae Thüm. (1878)
- Uromyces schinzianus Henn. (1906)
- Uromyces schismi Jørst. (1957)
- Uromyces schoenanthi Syd. & P. Syd. (1906)
- Uromyces schweinfurthii Henn. (1891)
- Uromyces scillinus (Durieu & Mont.) Har. (1913)
- Uromyces scirpi-maritimi Hirats. f. & Yoshin. (1942)
- Uromyces scirpinus Syd. (1931)
- Uromyces scleranthi Rostr. (1897)
- Uromyces scleriae Henn. (1899)
- Uromyces sclerochloae Tranzschel (1907)
- Uromyces scleropoae Baudyš & Picb. (1928)
- Uromyces scrophulariae (DC.) Fuckel (1870)
- Uromyces scutellatus (Schrank) Niessl (1864)
- Uromyces secamones Wakef. (1917)
- Uromyces sedi Gäum. (1954)
- Uromyces seditiosus F. Kern (1911)
- Uromyces seligeri Tranzschel & Erem. (1939)
- Uromyces sellierae G. Cunn. (1930)
- Uromyces semnanensis Gjaerum (1991)
- Uromyces senecionicola Arthur (1905)
- Uromyces senecionis-gigantis Gjaerum (1977)
- Uromyces senorensis J.F. Hennen & Cummins (1967)
- Uromyces sepultus Mains (1935)
- Uromyces seseli-graminis E. Fisch. (1906)
- Uromyces seselis Sousa da Câmara (1949)
- Uromyces sesseae Lagerh. (1910)
- Uromyces setariae-italicae Yoshino (1906)
- Uromyces shahrudensis Petr. (1949)
- Uromyces shearianus Arthur (1919)
- Uromyces shikokianus Kusano (1905)
- Uromyces sii-latifolii P. Karst. (1904)
- Uromyces silenes (Schltdl.) Fuckel (1870)
- Uromyces silenes-chloraefoliae Vienn.-Bourg. (1958)
- Uromyces silenes-ponticae Const. (1916)
- Uromyces silksvleyensis Mennicken & Oberw. (2004)
- Uromyces silphii (Syd. & P. Syd.) Arthur (1907)
- Uromyces simulans Peck (1879)
- Uromyces siphocampyli-gigantei Berndt (1999)
- Uromyces sisyrinchiicola Speg. (1924)
- Uromyces skottsbergii Jørst. (1957)
- Uromyces smilacis Mayor (1914)
- Uromyces snowdeniae Cummins (1956)
- Uromyces socius Arthur & Holw. (1918)
- Uromyces solani Dietel & Holw. (1897)
- Uromyces solariae Dietel (1908)
- Uromyces solidaginis (Sommerf.) Fuckel (1860)
- Uromyces solidaginis-caricis Arthur (1904)
- Uromyces solidus Berk. & M.A. Curtis (1874)
- Uromyces sommerfeltii Hyl., Jørst. & Nannf. (1953)
- Uromyces sonorensis J.F. Hennen & Cummins (1967)
- Uromyces sophorae Peck (1885)
- Uromyces sophorae-flavescentis Kusano (1904)
- Uromyces sophorae-japonicae Dietel (1902)
- Uromyces sophorae-viciifoliae F.L. Tai (1947)
- Uromyces sparaxadis Syd. & P. Syd. (1904)
- Uromyces sparganii Cooke & Peck (1874)
- Uromyces sparsus (J.C. Schmidt & Kunze) Cooke (1866)
- Uromyces spartii-juncei P. Syd. & Syd. (1909)
- Uromyces speciosus Holw. (1905)
- Uromyces spegazzinii (De Toni) Arthur (1910)
- Uromyces spermacoces (Schwein.) Thüm. (1867)
- Uromyces sphaericus H.S. Jacks. & Holw. (1932)
- Uromyces sphaerocarpus Syd. & P. Syd. (1904)
- Uromyces sphaerophysae Pospelov ex Nevod. (1952)
- Uromyces splendens A. Blytt (1896)
- Uromyces sporoboli Ellis & Everh. (1893)
- Uromyces sporobolicola J.C. Lindq. (1963)
- Uromyces sporoboloides Cummins (1956)
- Uromyces spragueae Harkn. (1884)
- Uromyces standleyanus Arthur (1924)
- Uromyces statices Berk. & M.A. Curtis (1860)
- Uromyces statices-sinensis Liou & Y.C. Wang (1935)
- Uromyces steironematis Arthur (1917)
- Uromyces stellariae Syd. & P. Syd. (1908)
- Uromyces stellariae-saxatilis L. Guo & Y.C. Wang (1987)
- Uromyces stenorrhynchi Henn. (1904)
- Uromyces stipinus Tranzschel & Erem. (1939)
- Uromyces strauchii Doidge (1928)
- Uromyces striatellus Tranzschel (1910)
- Uromyces striatus J. Schröt. (1870)
- Uromyces striolatus Tranzschel (1910)
- Uromyces strobilanthis Barclay (1890)
- Uromyces strumariae A.R. Wood (2002)
- Uromyces struthanthi Perd.-Sánch. (2014)
- Uromyces stylochaetonis Doidge (1927)
- Uromyces sublevis Tranzschel (1910)
- Uromyces substriatus Syd. & P. Syd. (1906)
- Uromyces suksdorfii Dietel & Holw. (1895)
- Uromyces superfixus Vestergr. (1905)
- Uromyces superfluus P. Syd. & Syd. (1910)
- Uromyces superstomatalis Berndt (2013)
- Uromyces suzukii Sawada ex Hirats. f. (1959)
- Uromyces symaethidis W. Schneid. (1927)

== T ==
- Uromyces tairae Hirats. f. (1940)
- Uromyces taleshensis M. Abbasi (2021)
- Uromyces tarapotensis Henn. (1904)
- Uromyces teheranicus Petr. (1957)
- Uromyces tehuelches Speg. (1925)
- Uromyces tener J. Schröt. (1896)
- Uromyces tenuicutis McAlpine (1906)
- Uromyces tenuistipes Dietel & Holw. (1897)
- Uromyces teodorescui Rayss (1937)
- Uromyces tepicensis J.F. Hennen & Cummins (1973)
- Uromyces tessariae (Speg.) J.C. Lindq. (1948)
- Uromyces thapsi Opiz ex Bubák (1906)
- Uromyces thellungi Maire (1917)
- Uromyces thelymitrae McAlpine (1906)
- Uromyces thermopsidicola Shimab. (1957)
- Uromyces tinctoriicola Magnus (1896)
- Uromyces tingitanus Henn. (1904)
- Uromyces tolerandus H.S. Jacks. & Holw. (1931)
- Uromyces tomentellus Cooke (1878)
- Uromyces tordillensis Speg. (1898)
- Uromyces tosensis Henn. (1903)
- Uromyces tournefortiae Henn. (1908)
- Uromyces tragi Wakef. & Hansf. (1949)
- Uromyces transcaspicus Petr. (1940)
- Uromyces transversalis (Thüm.) G. Winter (1884)
- Uromyces tranzschelii Syd. & P. Syd. (1910)
- Uromyces traucoensis Monteal. & Oehrens (1988)
- Uromyces triandrae T.S. Ramakr. & Sriniv. (1950)
- Uromyces trichoclines Henn. (1899)
- Uromyces tricholenae Gonz. Frag. & Cif. (1925)
- Uromyces trichoneurae Doidge (1939)
- Uromyces tricorynes McAlpine (1895)
- Uromyces trifolii-megalanthi (Dietel & Neger) H.S. Jacks. & Holw. (1931)
- Uromyces trifolii-purpurei Const. (1916)
- Uromyces trifolii-repentis (Castagne) Liro (1906)
- Uromyces trigonellae Pass. (1873)
- Uromyces trigonellae-occultae Henn. (1902)
- Uromyces tripogonicola Payak & Thirum. (1957)
- Uromyces tripogonis-sinensis Y.C. Wang (1965)
- Uromyces tripsaci F. Kern & Thurst. (1943)
- Uromyces triquetrus Cooke (1862)
- Uromyces triseti Katajev (1951)
- Uromyces triteleiae Dietel & Neger (1897)
- Uromyces trollii-caroli Ulbr. (1938)
- Uromyces trollipii Kalchbr. & MacOwan (1882)
- Uromyces tropaeoli Ranoj. (1914)
- Uromyces truncatulus Trotter (1904)
- Uromyces truncicola Henn. & Shirai (1900)
- Uromyces tuberculatus (Fuckel) Fuckel (1870)
- Uromyces tulipae Dietel (1900)
- Uromyces tungurahuensis Syd. (1939)
- Uromyces turcomanicus Katajev (1952)
- Uromyces tylosemae Gjaerum (1990)

== U ==
- Uromyces uleanus Dietel (1897)
- Uromyces umiamensis Berndt & Baiswar (2009)
- Uromyces undulatoparietis B. Li (1987)
- Uromyces undulatus Tranzschel (1910)
- Uromyces unioniensis Viégas (1945)
- Uromyces unitus Peck (1883)
- Uromyces urariae B. Li (1987)
- Uromyces urbanianus Henn. (1897)
- Uromyces urgineae M.S. Patil (1992)
- Uromyces ushuwaiensis Speg. (1924)
- Uromyces ustalis Tranzschel (1933)
- Uromyces usterianus Dietel (1908)

== V ==
- Uromyces valens F. Kern (1910)
- Uromyces valerianae (Schumach.) Fuckel (1870)
- Uromyces valerianae-microphyllae Berndt (1998)
- Uromyces valerianae-wallichii (Dietel) Arthur & Cummins (1933)
- Uromyces valesiacus E. Fisch. (1902)
- Uromyces vanderystii Henn. (1907)
- Uromyces vankyorum Berndt (2002)
- Uromyces venustus Dietel & Holw. (1901)
- Uromyces veratri (DC.) J. Schröt. (1870)
- Uromyces verbasci Niessl (1864)
- Uromyces verrucosae-craccae Mayor (1931)
- Uromyces verruculosus J. Schröt. (1873)
- Uromyces verus H.S. Jacks. & Holw. (1931)
- Uromyces vesicatorius (Bubák) Nattrass (1937)
- Uromyces vesiculosus G. Winter (1885)
- Uromyces vestergrenii P. Syd. & Syd. (1909)
- Uromyces viciae-craccae Const. (1904)
- Uromyces viciae-fabae (Pers.) J. Schröt. (1875)
- Uromyces viciae-unijugae S. Ito (1922)
- Uromyces vicinus H.S. Jacks. & Holw. (1931)
- Uromyces vicosensis R.T. Almeida (1977)
- Uromyces viegasii R.T. Almeida (1977)
- Uromyces viennot-bourginii J. Anikster & I. Wahl (1967)
- Uromyces vignae Barclay (1891)
- Uromyces vignae-luteolae Henn. (1907)
- Uromyces vignae-sinensis Miura (1928)
- Uromyces visci T. Majewski & K.A. Nowak (1982)
- Uromyces volkartii Gäum. & Terrier (1952)
- Uromyces vossiae Barclay (1890)
- Uromyces vulpiae Sousa da Câmara (1949)

== W ==
- Uromyces waipoua McNabb (1966)
- Uromyces wartoensis Petr. (1942)
- Uromyces wedeliae Henn. (1904)
- Uromyces wedeliae-biflorae Boedijn (1940)
- Uromyces wellingtonicus T.S. Ramakr. & K. Ramakr. (1948)
- Uromyces wiehei Cummins (1952)
- Uromyces wolfii Cummins (1952)
- Uromyces wulffiae Henn. (1904)
- Uromyces wulffiae-stenoglossae Dietel (1908)

== Y ==
- Uromyces yakushimensis Hirats. f. & Katsuki (1952)
- Uromyces yatsugatakensis Hirats. f. (1935)
- Uromyces yoshinagae Henn. (1901)
- Uromyces yurimaguasensis Henn. (1904)

== Z ==
- Uromyces zeyheri Bubák (1910)
- Uromyces zigadeni Peck (1881)
- Uromyces zizaniae-latifoliae Sawada (1922)
