= Uromyces umiamensis =

Scientific classification
- Kingdom: Fungi
- Division: Basidiomycota
- Class: Pucciniomycetes
- Order: Pucciniales
- Family: Pucciniaceae
- Genus: Uromyces
- Species: U. umiamensis

Binomial name
- Uromyces umiamensis Berndt & Baiswar

Species of rust fungus

Uromyces umiamensis is a species of rust fungus in family Pucciniaceae that grows on the leaves of the gac plant. Formally described in 2009, it is known from India.

== Taxonomy and etymology ==
Reinhard Berndt and Pankaj Baiswar described the species in 2009. They gave it the specific name umiamensis in reference to the type locality, the village of Umiam, located in Meghalaya, India.

== Description ==
Uromyces umiamensis appears to be demicyclic, with no known uredinia or spermogonia.

The telia form ash gray blisters under the epidermus of the leaf. Once the epidermis is broken open, they become a powdery chetnut brown. On average, the teliospores are 29 microns long and 22.1 microns wide. Their spore walls are varying shades of brown and are elliptical or roughly eggshaped. Apart from some rows or warts, the surface is smooth. The germ pore is apical with an almost colorless, wide and flat cap on top of it.

The aecidia form blisters and domes on the leaf that take the shape of cups once they open. When dry, the spore mass and peridium are white, with the peridium curved inward and torn. The aecidiospores are 23.8 microns long and 14.6 microns wide on average and can be roughly cube shaped or elliptical. The spore wall is colorless, thickened on the far end, and is thickly and evenly covered in small bumps.

== Ecology ==
Uromyces umiamensis grows on the leaves of Momordica cochinchinensis (the gac plant) and is the only known member of its genus to grow on the genus Momordica. The aecidia either grow on their own or in small clusters, usually on the underside of the leaf. The telia clusters on the opposite side of the aecidia on the upper side, occaisonally in a nearly concentric manner.
