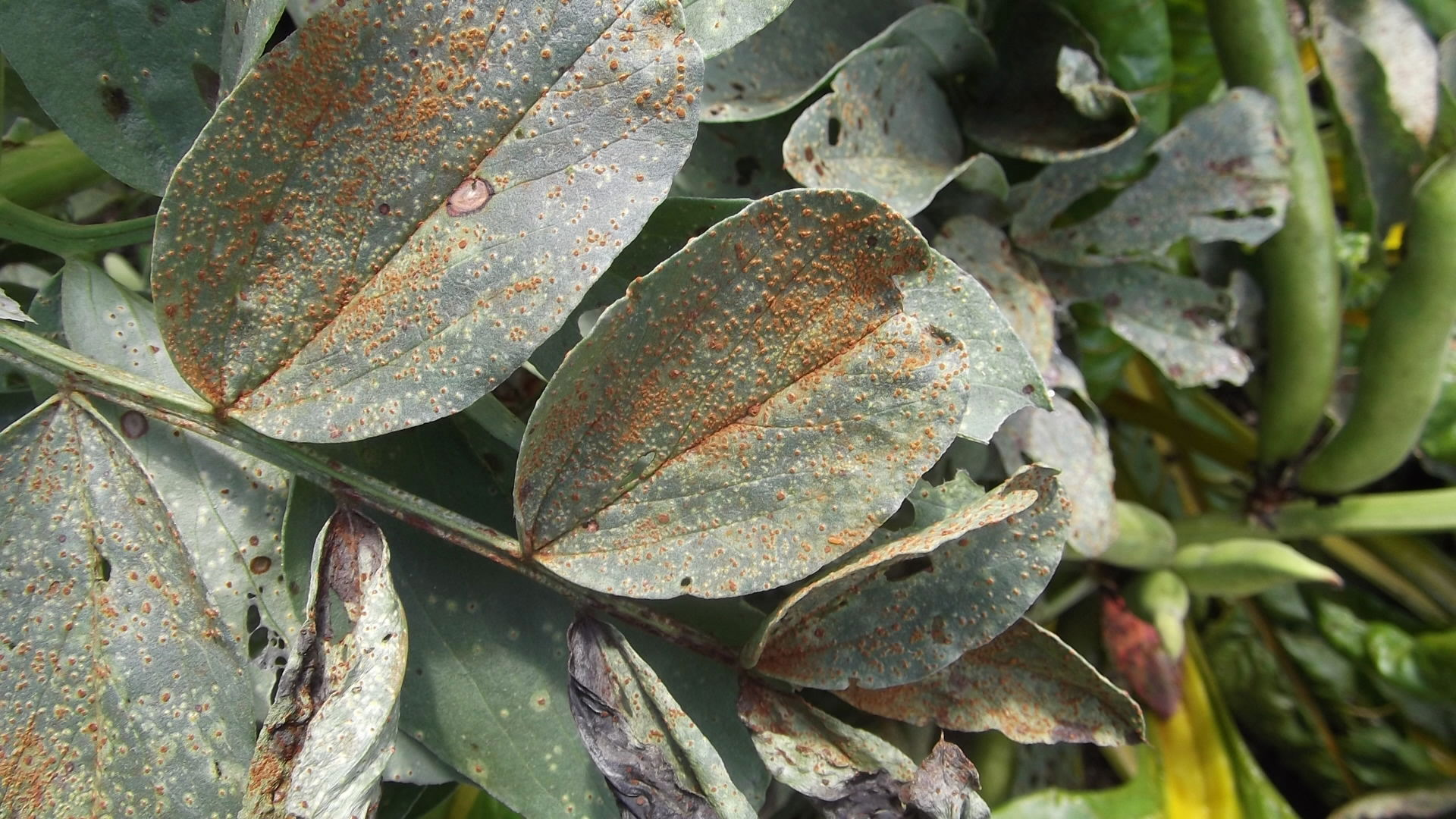

Scientific classification
- Kingdom: Fungi
- Division: Basidiomycota
- Class: Pucciniomycetes
- Order: Pucciniales
- Family: Pucciniaceae
- Genus: Uromyces
- Species: U. viciae-fabae
- Variety: U. v. var. viciae-fabae

Trinomial name
- Uromyces viciae-fabae var. viciae-fabae (Pers.) J. Schröt., (1875)

Synonyms
- Capitularia fabae (Pers.) Syd., (1922); Puccinia fabae Link; Puccinia fabae Grev., (1823); Puccinia fallens Cooke, (1866); Puccinia globosa Grev.; Trichobasis fabae Lév., (1840); Uredo fabae Pers., (1794); Uredo viciae-fabae Pers., (1801); Uromyces fabae (Pers.) de Bary, (1879); Uromyces viciae Fuckel, (1870); Uromyces viciae-fabae (Pers.) J. Schröt., (1875)

= Uromyces viciae-fabae var. viciae-fabae =

Species of fungus

Uromyces viciae-fabae var. viciae-fabae is a plant pathogen commonly known as faba-bean rust. The rust is distinguished by the typical rust-like marks on the stem and leaves, causing defoliation and loss of photosynthetic surface along with reduction in yield. The disease is fungal and is autoecious meaning it has one plant host. The rust of faba beans is macrocyclic, or contains 5 spores during its life cycle.

== Disease cycle ==
Faba bean rust has a complex lifecycle containing three different stages. Each stage of the cycle has different symptoms. Faba bean rust grows best in July and August as the weather in these months is most fit. The required environment for infection after spores land on a plant consists of rainfall or dew. Also, weather that is humid and warm promotes the spread. Spores can be spread by wind to other plants. An important factor in development of rust epidemics is the infection of volunteer faba bean plants. The disease cycle is as follows: the overwintering diploid teliospores germinate in the spring with metabasidium forming four haploid basidiospores of two mating types, types (+) and (-) are formed. Next haploid pycniospores are exchanged between pycnidia of different mating types on the upper leaf surface.

== Symptoms ==
General symptoms that one can notice while looking at the leaves of a faba bean plant that has this rust disease are that the leaves will have numerous small, orange/brown pustules. These pustules are surrounded by a light yellow halo. The yellow halo is where the plant has blocked the spread of the fungus to healthy cells. The plant does this by killing the diseased plant cells forming the halo. Disease progression can cause leaves to wither and fall off of the plant. The stems of the bean plant are also affected by the rust and show symptoms of the rust pustules but are often bigger than those that are found on the leaf surface.

The various stages of Faba bean rust and its different symptoms are as stated:

=== Aceal symptoms ===
Pustules develop on the leaves early in the season appearing as small creamy yellow spots. The spores produced in the pustules are aeciospores and spread the disease throughout the plant by wind. When these spores are released they are deposited as yellow powder. The aeciospores are found in chains of 7-8 spores and are sessile.

=== Uredinial symptoms ===
Orange-brown pustules with a pale halo on leaves and stems replaces the aecia. These pustules will leave a rusty deposit if touched and they contain a large number of urediospores that spread the rust.

=== Telial stage symptoms ===
In the late season, pustules that are a black-brown color are produced and are surrounded by the same pale halo on the stems and leaves. This is the resting stage that survives over summer and these pustules contain the teliospores. These teliospores are produced in the aecial or uredial pustules. These spores are the resting spores of the rust disease. Teliospores are resistant to harsh weather and stick to the underside of the leaves which helps for overwintering. They are also thicker spores measuring about 90 pm making them sturdy to the weather.

== Management ==
There are various ways to manage the disease Uromyces viciae-fabae var. viciae-fabae, however because the spores of the fungus can travel long distances to infect a new crop prevention can be difficult. First, using clean seed to plant the beans is best to prevent the spread of the pathogen. Using contaminated seeds, from plots where the disease was, is an easy way to spread the disease to other locations. Secondly, spores that land on volunteer plants, which are plants that grow on their own from seeds floating by wind or birds, can be spread long distances by wind increasing the spread of the disease. These volunteer plants should be controlled early in the season often by the use of herbicides to kill the faba bean plant completely. Another way to control disease is to rotate crops; crops should be rotated about 500 meters from where the faba beans were last planted as a preventative measure. Since they are host specific if there are still spores present in that area they will not be able to infect the new crop planted. Resistance is another control method. Resistance is the most desired means of rust control. Planting a variety that is resistant to rust is helpful in preventing disease. Foliar fungicides are another way of control; recommended fungicides need to be applied before severe symptoms are seen.
