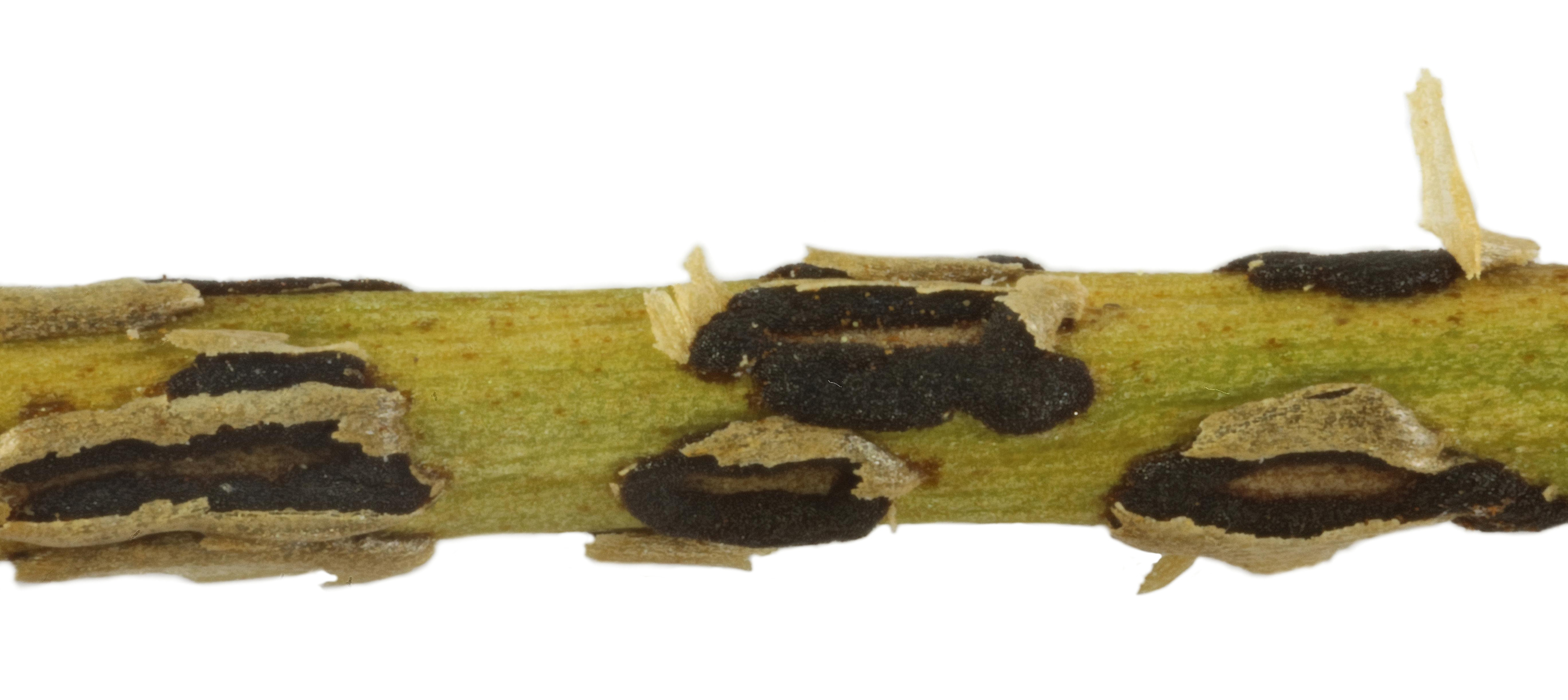
- Uromyces junci on Juncus subnodulosus

Scientific classification
- Domain: Eukaryota
- Kingdom: Fungi
- Division: Basidiomycota
- Class: Pucciniomycetes
- Order: Pucciniales
- Family: Pucciniaceae
- Genus: Uromyces
- Species: U. junci

Binomial name
- Uromyces junci Tul. (1854)

Synonyms
- List: Aecidium zonale Bréb., in Duby, Bot. Gall., Edn 2 (Paris) 2: 906 (1830); Coeomurus junci (Tul.) Kuntze [as 'Caeomurus'], Revis. gen. pl. (Leipzig) 3(3): 450 (1898); Nigredo junci (Tul.) Arthur, N. Amer. Fl. (New York) 7(3): 238 (1920); Puccinia junci Desm., Pl. crypt. exsicc. 1: no. 81 (1825)

= Uromyces junci =

Species of fungus

Uromyces junci is a fungus species and plant pathogen which causes rust on various plants including (Rushes) Juncus species.

It appears as a whitish peridium and a pale yellow mass of spores, it can be found on Pulicaria dysenterica, Juncus articulatus, Juncus bufonius, Juncus effusus, Juncus inflexus and Juncus subnodulosus.

It is mainly found in Europe, North America, New Zealand and parts of South America.

In 1994, it was found in Japan.
