= Uromyces betae =

Scientific classification
- Kingdom: Fungi
- Division: Basidiomycota
- Class: Pucciniomycetes
- Order: Pucciniales
- Family: Pucciniaceae
- Genus: Uromyces
- Species: U. betae

Binomial name
- Uromyces betae (Pers.) Tul. (1854)

Synonyms
- List: Nigredo betae (Pers.) Arthur; Aecidium betae J.G. Kühn, in Rabenhorst, Fungi europ. exsicc. Klotzschii herbarii vivi mycologici continuatio, Edn nova. Series secunda, Cent. 14: no. 1393 (1870); Coeomurus betae (Pers.) Kuntze [as 'Caeomurus'], Revis. gen. pl. (Leipzig) 3(3): 449 (1898); Nigredo betae (Pers.) Arthur, N. Amer. Fl. (New York) 7(3): 245 (1920); Trichobasis betae (Pers.) Niessl, Verh. nat. Ver. Brünn 3: 115 (1864); Uredo betae Pers., Syn. meth. fung. (Göttingen) 1: 220 (1801); Uredo beticola Westend. [as 'betaecola'], Herb. crypt. Belg.: no. 1170 (1857); Uredo beticola Bellynck, in Westendorp, Bull. Acad. R. Sci. Belg., Cl. Sci., sér. 2 11(6): 650 (1861); Uredo cincta ß betae (Pers.) F. Strauss, Ann. Wetter. Gesellsch. Ges. Naturk. 2: 96 (1811); Uromyces betae (Pers.) Lév., Annls Sci. Nat., Bot., sér. 3 8: 375 (1847); Uromyces beticola (Bellynck) Boerema, Loer. & Hamers, Neth. Jl Pl. Path. 93(suppl.): 17 (1987)

Species of fungus

Uromyces betae is a fungal species and plant pathogen infecting beet (Beta vulgaris).

It was originally published as Uredo betae Pers. 1801 before it was transferred to the Uromyces genus.

Sugar beet rust was first described in Canada in 1935,(Newton and Peturson 1943), and then reported in Europe in 1988 (O'Sullivan).

It is a rust which affects only beet, causing brown-orange spotting of the plant's leaves with rusty pustules of urediniospores at the centre of the spots. The rust can stay on overwintered seed crops or as teliospores which contaminate seed storage. Severe rust attacks to the crop can cause yield losses (of about 15% of root weight and 1% of sugar content). or up to 10% in the United Kingdom.

Other hosts of the fungus includes, sugar beet, beetroot, spinach beet, mangolds and wild beet (Beta vulgaris subsp. vulgaris, Beta vulgaris subsp. maritima), Beta vulgaris, Beta cycla and Beta rapa.

It is found in; Africa (within Algeria, Canary Islands, Libya, Madeira, Morocco and S. Africa); Asia (within Israel, Iran and U.S.S.R.); Australasia (within Australia, New Zealand and Tasmania); Europe (within Austria, Belgium, Bulgaria, Channel Islands, Czechoslovakia, Cyprus, Denmark, Finland, France, Germany, Greece, Great Britain, Holland, Hungary, Ireland, Italy, Latvia, Malta, Norway, Poland, Portugal, Romania, Sardinia, Spain, Sweden, Switzerland, Turkey and Yugoslavia); North America (within Canada, Mexico and U.S.A.) and also in South America (within Argentina, Bolivia, Chile and Uruguay).
