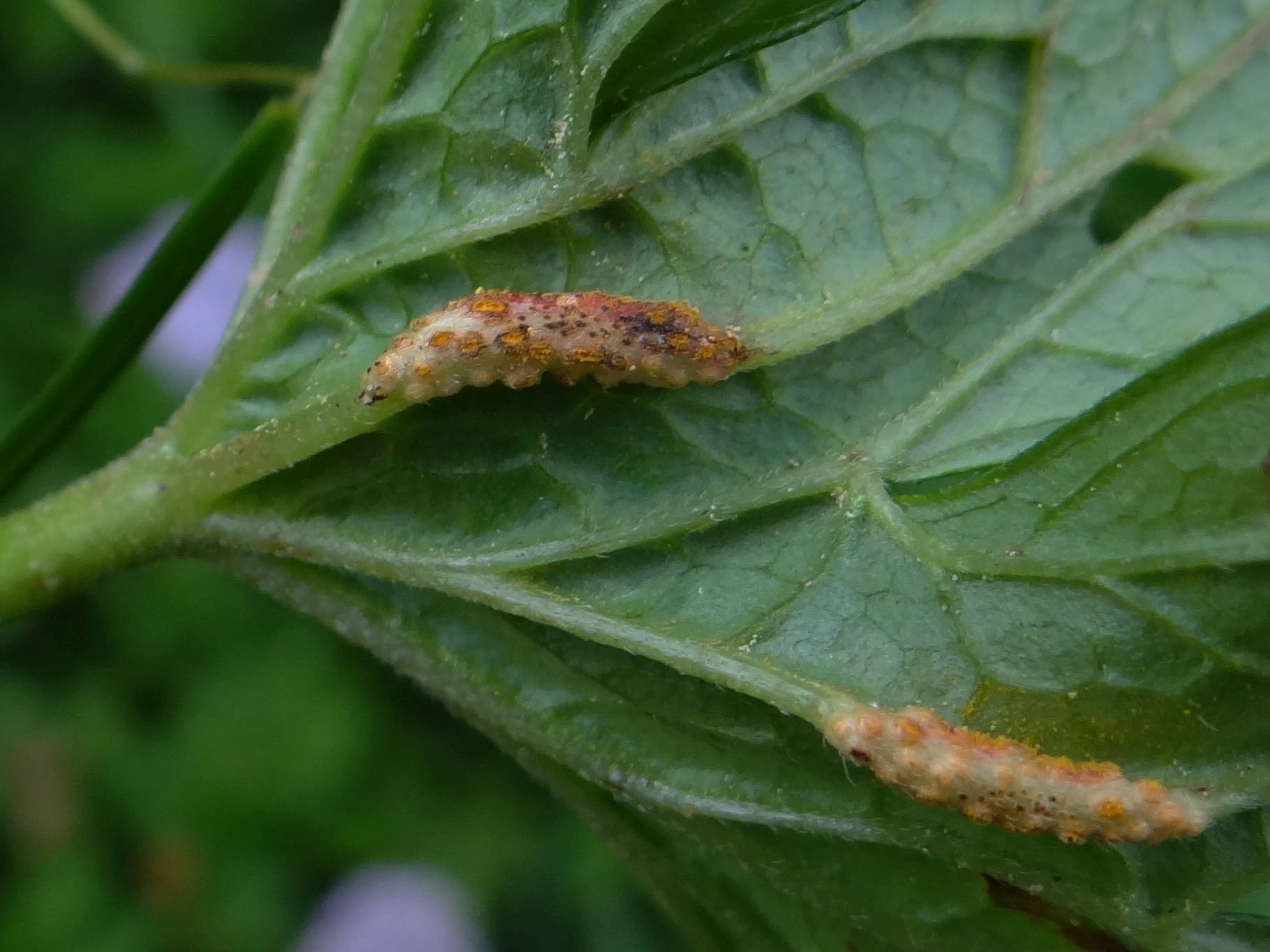
- Uromyces geranii on a Geranium sp. leaf in Poland

Scientific classification
- Domain: Eukaryota
- Kingdom: Fungi
- Division: Basidiomycota
- Class: Pucciniomycetes
- Order: Pucciniales
- Family: Pucciniaceae
- Genus: Uromyces
- Species: U. geranii

Binomial name
- Uromyces geranii (DC.) G.H. Otth & Wartm. (1847)

Synonyms
- List: Aecidium geranii DC., Fl. franç., Edn 3 (Paris) 5/6: 93 (1815); Caeoma geraniatum Link, in Willdenow, Sp. pl., Edn 4 6(2): 57 (1825); Caeoma geranii (DC.) Schltdl., Fl. berol. (Berlin) 2: 128 (1824); Coeomurus geranii (DC.) Kuntze [as 'Caeomurus'], Revis. gen. pl. (Leipzig) 3(3): 450 (1898); Nigredo geranii (DC.) Arthur, N. Amer. Fl. (New York) 7(11): 765 (1926); Trichobasis geranii Berk., Outl. Brit. Fung. (London): 333 (1860); Uredo geranii DC., de Candolle. Bot. Gall. (Paris): 47 (1806); Uromyces kabatianus Bubák, Sber. K. böhm. Ges. Wiss. Prag 46: 1 (1902); Uromyces geranii var. kabatianus (Bubák) U. Braun, Feddes Repert. Spec. Nov. Regni Veg. 93(3-4): 294 (1982)

= Uromyces geranii =

Species of fungus

Uromyces geranii is a fungus species and plant pathogen which causes rust on geranium plants.

The appearance of the fungus on the underside of the geranium leaves may vary depending on maturity of the rust, from dark spots (when first appearance) to orange swellings up to 2 cm in length.
