= Puccinia sambuci =

Scientific classification
- Kingdom: Fungi
- Division: Basidiomycota
- Class: Pucciniomycetes
- Order: Pucciniales
- Family: Pucciniaceae
- Genus: Puccinia
- Species: P. sambuci

Binomial name
- Puccinia sambuci (Schwein.) Arthur

Species of fungus

Puccinia sambuci, elderberry rust, is a species of rust fungi in the family Pucciniaceae. It infects elderberry and sedge.
