= Uromyces inconspicuus =

Scientific classification
- Domain: Eukaryota
- Kingdom: Fungi
- Division: Basidiomycota
- Class: Pucciniomycetes
- Order: Pucciniales
- Family: Pucciniaceae
- Genus: Uromyces
- Species: U. inconspicuus

Binomial name
- Uromyces inconspicuus G.H.Otth

Species of fungus

Uromyces inconspicuus is a plant pathogen infecting hemp.
