= Uromyces steironematis =

Scientific classification
- Kingdom: Fungi
- Division: Basidiomycota
- Class: Pucciniomycetes
- Order: Pucciniales
- Family: Pucciniaceae
- Genus: Uromyces
- Species: U. steironematis

Binomial name
- Uromyces steironematis Arthur (1917)

Species of fungus

Uromyces steironematis is a species of rust fungus and plant pathogen in the family Pucciniaceae. The fungus produces its aecia on plants in the family Primulaceae, including Lysimachia ciliata (formerly Steironema ciliatum). The fungus was collected on Spartina michauxiana in Palmer, Nebraska in 1905 by Rev. J. M. Bates, and was formally described by mycologist Joseph Charles Arthur in 1917. U. steironematis is distributed across parts of the Midwestern United States.
