= Uromyces euphorbiae =

Scientific classification
- Domain: Eukaryota
- Kingdom: Fungi
- Division: Basidiomycota
- Class: Pucciniomycetes
- Order: Pucciniales
- Family: Pucciniaceae
- Genus: Uromyces
- Species: U. euphorbiae

Binomial name
- Uromyces euphorbiae Cooke & Peck (1873)

Synonyms
- Coeomurus euphorbiae (Cooke & Peck) Kuntze, Revis. gen. pl. (Leipzig) 3(3): 450 (1898)

Species of fungus

Uromyces euphorbiae is a fungal species (in the Pucciniaceae family and Pucciniales order) and a plant pathogen infecting poinsettias.

It was originally found on the leaves of Euphorbia hypericifolia in New York, USA.

The fungus can be found on various species of Acalypha, Chamaesyce, and also other Euphorbia species (Euphorbiaceae) worldwide.

It is found on other Euphorbia species, such as Euphorbia hirta, and Euphorbia cheiradenia Boiss. & Hohen.

It is known by the rust pustules which are delimited by a necrotic band which has a reddish-brown border.

Uromyces euphorbiae can be distinguished from other Uromyces fungal species found on various Euphorbia species (in Turkey) by comparing its macrocyclic life cycle, dark brown teleutospores and also the big warts located on the teleutospores wall.
