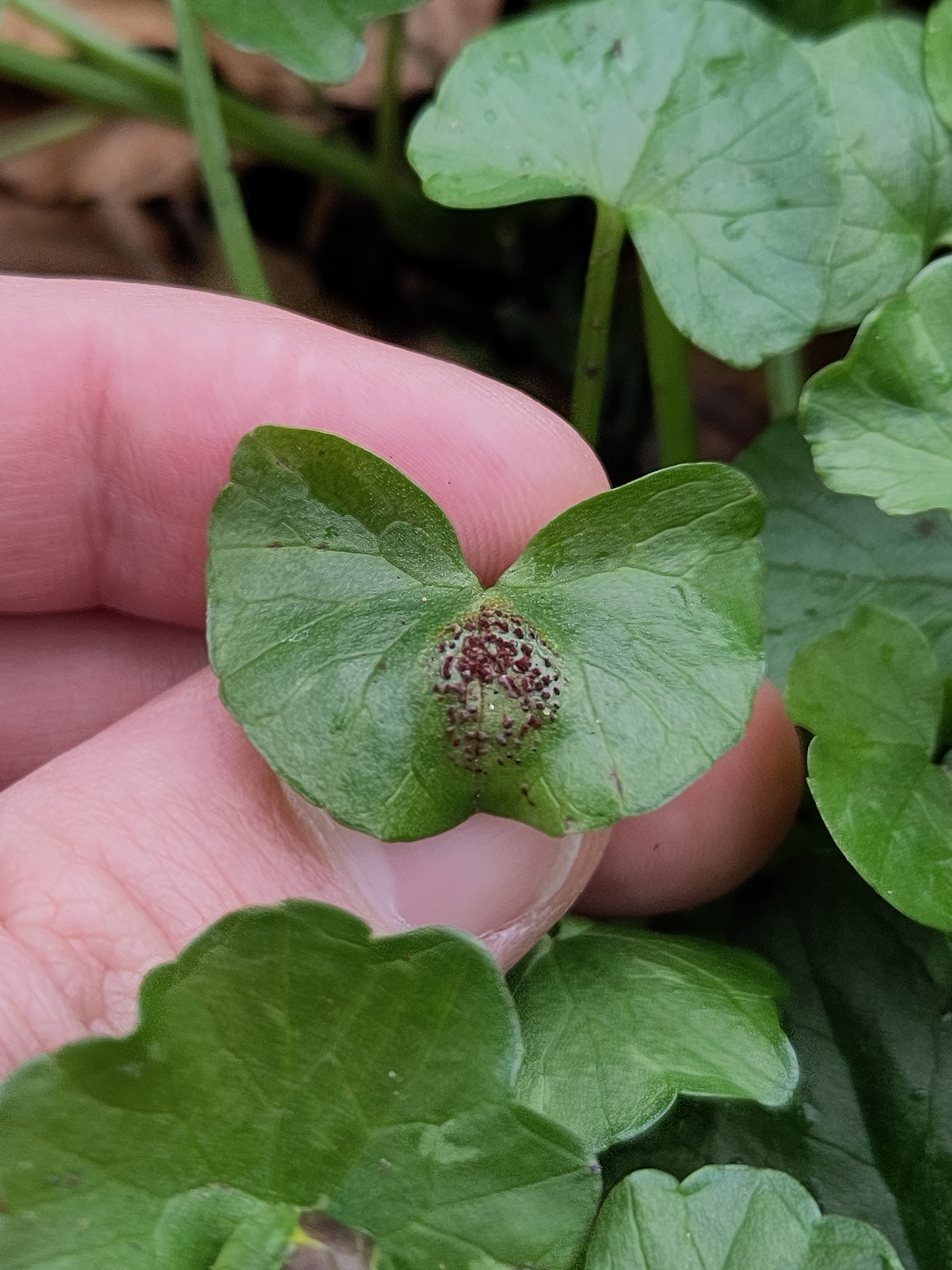
- Telia of Uromyces ficariae on Ficaria verna.

Scientific classification
- Domain: Eukaryota
- Kingdom: Fungi
- Division: Basidiomycota
- Class: Pucciniomycetes
- Order: Pucciniales
- Family: Pucciniaceae
- Genus: Uromyces
- Species: U. ficariae

Binomial name
- Uromyces ficariae (Schumach.) Lév.

= Uromyces ficariae =

Species of fungus

Uromyces ficariae is a fungal plant pathogen infecting several species in the genus Ficaria.
