= Uromyces apiosporus =

Scientific classification
- Domain: Eukaryota
- Kingdom: Fungi
- Division: Basidiomycota
- Class: Pucciniomycetes
- Order: Pucciniales
- Family: Pucciniaceae
- Genus: Uromyces
- Species: U. apiosporus

Binomial name
- Uromyces apiosporus Hazsl. (1873)

Synonyms
- Coeomurus apiosporus (Hazsl.) Kuntze [as 'Caeomurus'], Revis. gen. pl. (Leipzig) 3(3): 449 (1898)

Species of fungus

Uromyces apiosporus is a fungal species and plant pathogen infecting Primula. Including Primula minima L. in New Zealand.
