= Uromyces ciceris-arietini =

Scientific classification
- Domain: Eukaryota
- Kingdom: Fungi
- Division: Basidiomycota
- Class: Pucciniomycetes
- Order: Pucciniales
- Family: Pucciniaceae
- Genus: Uromyces
- Species: U. ciceris-arietini

Binomial name
- Uromyces ciceris-arietini (Grognot) Jacz. & Boyd (1894)

Synonyms
- Coeomurus ciceris-arientini (Grognot) Kuntze [as 'Caeomurus'], Revis. gen. pl. (Leipzig) 3(3): 449 (1898); Uredo ciceris-arietini Grognot, Pl. crypt.-cellul. Saône-et-Loire: 157 (1863)

Species of fungus

Uromyces ciceris-arietini is a fungal species and plant pathogen infecting chickpea (Cicer arietinum).

Uromyces ciceris-arietini was first found on chickpeas in Australia in 1983, and then in the US in 1987.

It also affects 29 species in the Medicago genus including; Medicago polyceratia and Medicago polymorpha plants in USA.

== Other sources ==
- Rubiales D, Moreno I, Moreno MT, Sillero JC (2001) Identification of Partial Resistance to chickpea rust (Uromyces ciceris-arietini). In: European Association for Grain Legume Research-AEP (eds), Proceedings of the 4th European Conference on Grain Legumes, Cracow, pp 194–195
