= Uromyces musae =

Scientific classification
- Kingdom: Fungi
- Division: Basidiomycota
- Class: Pucciniomycetes
- Order: Pucciniales
- Family: Pucciniaceae
- Genus: Uromyces
- Species: U. musae

Binomial name
- Uromyces musae Henn. (1907)

Species of fungus

Uromyces musae is a fungal species and plant pathogen infecting bananas. It is described as forming rusty-brown to almost black, erumpent (bursting through a surface or covering) and partially linear pustules, mostly on the lower leaf surface of the host plant.

U. musae is primarily distributed across the southwest Pacific region, including the Philippines, Fiji, and Wallis Island, but has also been reported in African nations such as the Democratic Republic of the Congo and Nigeria. The fungus was first collected on the leaves of Musa species in the DR Congo.
