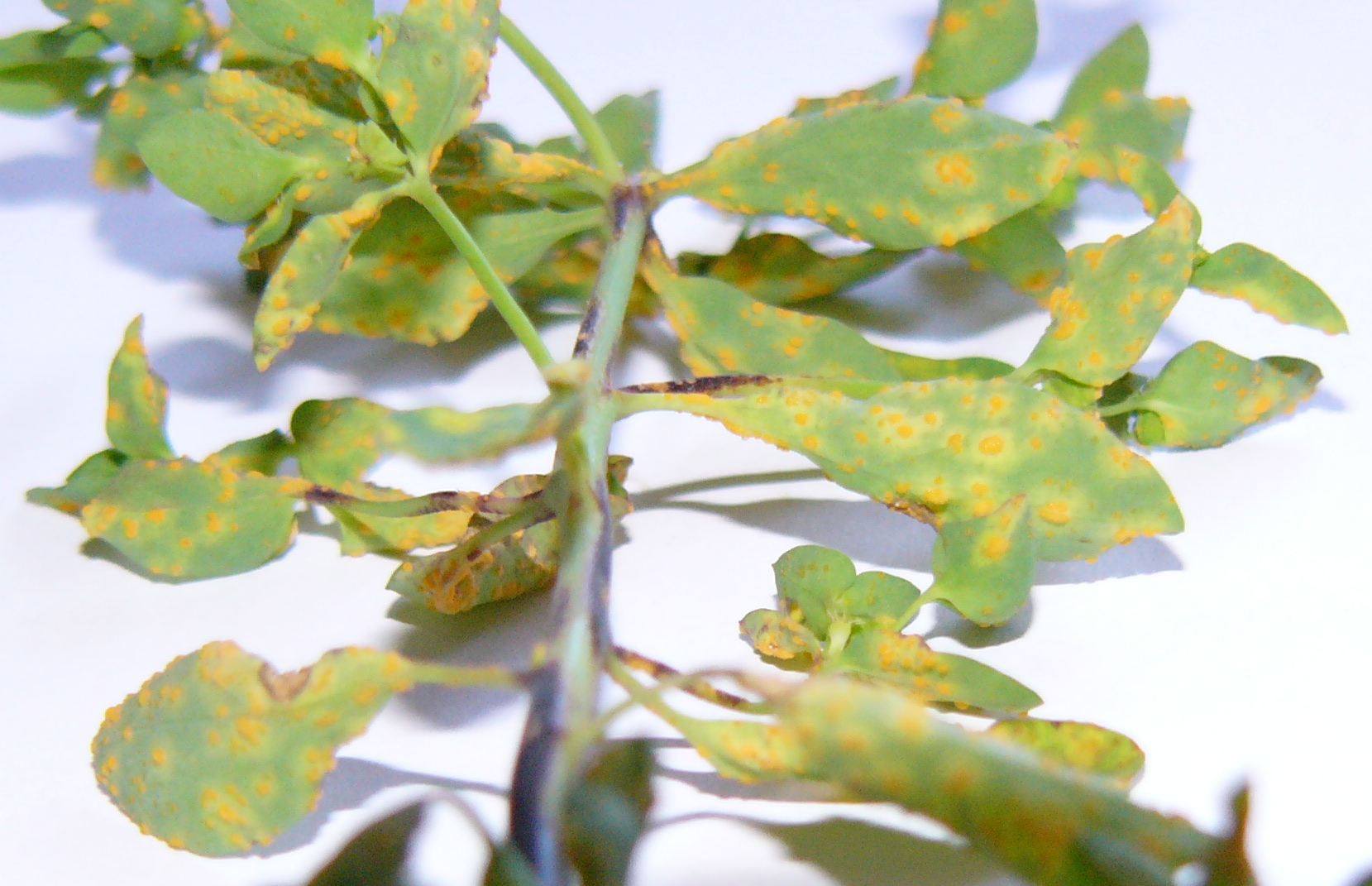
- Uromyces pisi-sativi on leaves of cypress spurge (Euphorbia cyparissias)

Scientific classification
- Domain: Eukaryota
- Kingdom: Fungi
- Division: Basidiomycota
- Class: Pucciniomycetes
- Order: Pucciniales
- Family: Pucciniaceae
- Genus: Uromyces
- Species: U. pisi-sativi

Binomial name
- Uromyces pisi-sativi (Pers.) Liro, 1908

Synonyms
- List: Aecidium euphorbiarum DC., Fl. franç., Edn 3 (Paris) 5/6: 91 (1815); Caeoma euphorbiatum Link, in Willdenow, Sp. pl., Edn 4 6(2): 61 (1825); Coeomurus astragali (Sacc.) Kuntze [as 'Caeomurus'], Revis. gen. pl. (Leipzig) 3(3): 449 (1898); Coeomurus phacae (Thüm.) Kuntze [as 'Caeomurus'], Revis. gen. pl. (Leipzig) 3(3): 450 (1898); Coeomurus pisi (DC.) Gray, Nat. Arr. Brit. Pl. (London) 1: 541 (1821); Coeomurus pisi (Pers.) Kuntze [as 'Caeomurus'], Revis. gen. pl. (Leipzig) 3(3): 449 (1898); Dicaeoma loti (L.A. Kirchn.) Kuntze, Revis. gen. pl. (Leipzig) 3(3): 469 (1898); Nigredo pisi (Pers.) Arthur, Résult. Sci. Congr. Bot. Wien 1905: 344 (1906); Nigredo punctata (J. Schröt.) Arthur, N. Amer. Fl. (New York) 7(3): 253 (1920); Puccinia laburni DC., in Lamarck & de Candolle, Fl. franç., Edn 3 (Paris) 2: 224 (1805); Puccinia loti L.A. Kirchn., Lotos 6: 181 (1856); Puccinia pisi DC., in Lamarck & de Candolle, Fl. franç., Edn 3 (Paris) 2: 224 (1805); Uredo appendiculata ß pisi Pers., Observ. mycol. (Lipsiae) 1: 17 (1796); Uredo appendiculata ß pisi-sativi Pers., Syn. meth. fung. (Göttingen) 1: 222 (1801); Uredo appendiculata ? genistae-tinctoriae Pers., Syn. meth. fung. (Göttingen) 1: 222 (1801); Uredo astragali Opiz, Seznam Rostlin Kveteny Ceské: 151 (1852); Uredo onobrychidis Desm., Catal. des plantes omis.: 25 (1823); Uromyces astragali Sacc., Atti Soc. Veneto-Trent. Sci. Nat. 2(1): 208 (1873); Uromyces euphorbiae-astragali Jordi, Centbl. Bakt. ParasitKde, Abt. I 11: 790 (1904); Uromyces euphorbiae-corniculatae Jordi, Centbl. Bakt. ParasitKde, Abt. I 11: 791 (1904); Uromyces genistae-tinctoriae (Pers.) Fuckel ex G. Winter, Pilze Deutschl.: 146 (1884); Uromyces genistae-tinctoriae f. anglicae MacDon., Trans. Br. mycol. Soc. 29(1-2): 67 (1946); Uromyces genistae-tinctoriae f. scoparii MacDon., Trans. Br. mycol. Soc. 29(1-2): 67 (1946); Uromyces genistae-tinctoriae f. ulicis MacDon., Trans. Br. mycol. Soc. 29(1-2): 67 (1946); Uromyces laburni (DC.) G.H. Otth, Mitt. naturf. Ges. Bern 531-552: 87 (1864); Uromyces laburni Fuckel, Jb. nassau. Ver. Naturk. 23-24: 62 (1870); Uromyces lathyri Fuckel, Jb. nassau. Ver. Naturk. 23-24: 62 (1870); Uromyces loti A. Blytt, Forhandl. Vidensk.-Selsk. Christiania (no. 6): 37 (1896); Uromyces onobrychidis (Desm.) Lév., Annls Sci. Nat., Bot., sér. 3 8: 371 (1847); Uromyces phacae Thüm., Bull. Soc. Imp. nat. Moscou 53(1-2): 218 (1878); Uromyces pisi (Pers.) de Bary, Mitt. naturf. Ges. Bern 531-552: 87 (1864); Uromyces pisi (DC.) G.H. Otth, Mitt. naturf. Ges. Bern 531-552: 87 (1864); Uromyces punctatus J. Schröt., Abh. Schles. Ges. Vaterl. Kult., Abth. Naturw. Med. 48: 10 (1870); Uromyces punctatus var. dahurici T.Z. Liu & J.Y. Zhuang [as 'dahuricus'], in Liu, Zhuang & Yang, Mycosystema 35(12): 1486 (2016); Uromyces striatus var. loti A. Blytt ex Arthur, Manual of the Rusts in the United States & Canada: 300 (1934)

= Uromyces pisi-sativi =

Species of fungus

Uromyces pisi-sativi is a fungal species and plant pathogen. It was originally found on Pea (Pisum sativum) but it is found on a wide range of host plants.

It causes small orange dots on the lower side of leaves on Euphorbia cyparissias. It lives on Pisum and on Lathyrus and on other plants from the family Fabaceae. The list of hosts also includes; Cytisus scoparius, Chamaecytisus palmensis and Lupinus polyphyllus.

== Distribution ==
It has been recorded as being found almost worldwide; from Africa (within the Canary Islands, Ethiopia, Libya and Morocco); from Asia (within China, India, Iran, Pakistan and Turkey); from Europe (within Austria, Belgium, Bulgaria, Corsica, Cyprus, Czechoslovakia, Denmark, Finland, France, Germany, Great Britain, Greece, Hungary, Italy, Malta, Netherlands, Norway, Poland, Portugal, Romania, Sicily, Spain, Sweden, Switzerland, U.S.S.R. and Yugoslavia); from South America (Argentina and Chile) (CMI Map 404 and Herb. IMI). Also Australia and New Zealand.
