= Uromyces elegans =

Scientific classification
- Domain: Eukaryota
- Kingdom: Fungi
- Division: Basidiomycota
- Class: Pucciniomycetes
- Order: Pucciniales
- Family: Pucciniaceae
- Genus: Uromyces
- Species: U. elegans

Binomial name
- Uromyces elegans (Berk. & M.A. Curtis) Lagerh., 1895

Synonyms
- Aecidium elegans Berk. & M.A. Curtis, 1853; Caeomurus elegans (Berk. & M.A. Curtis) Kuntze, 1898; Coeomurus elegans (Berk. & M.A. Curtis) Kuntze, 1898

Species of fungus

Uromyces elegans is a species of rust fungi in the family Pucciniaceae.
