= Uromyces graminis =

Scientific classification
- Kingdom: Fungi
- Division: Basidiomycota
- Class: Pucciniomycetes
- Order: Pucciniales
- Family: Pucciniaceae
- Genus: Uromyces
- Species: U. graminis

Binomial name
- Uromyces graminis (Niessl) Dietel, 1892)

Species of fungus

Uromyces graminis is a plant pathogen infecting carrots.
