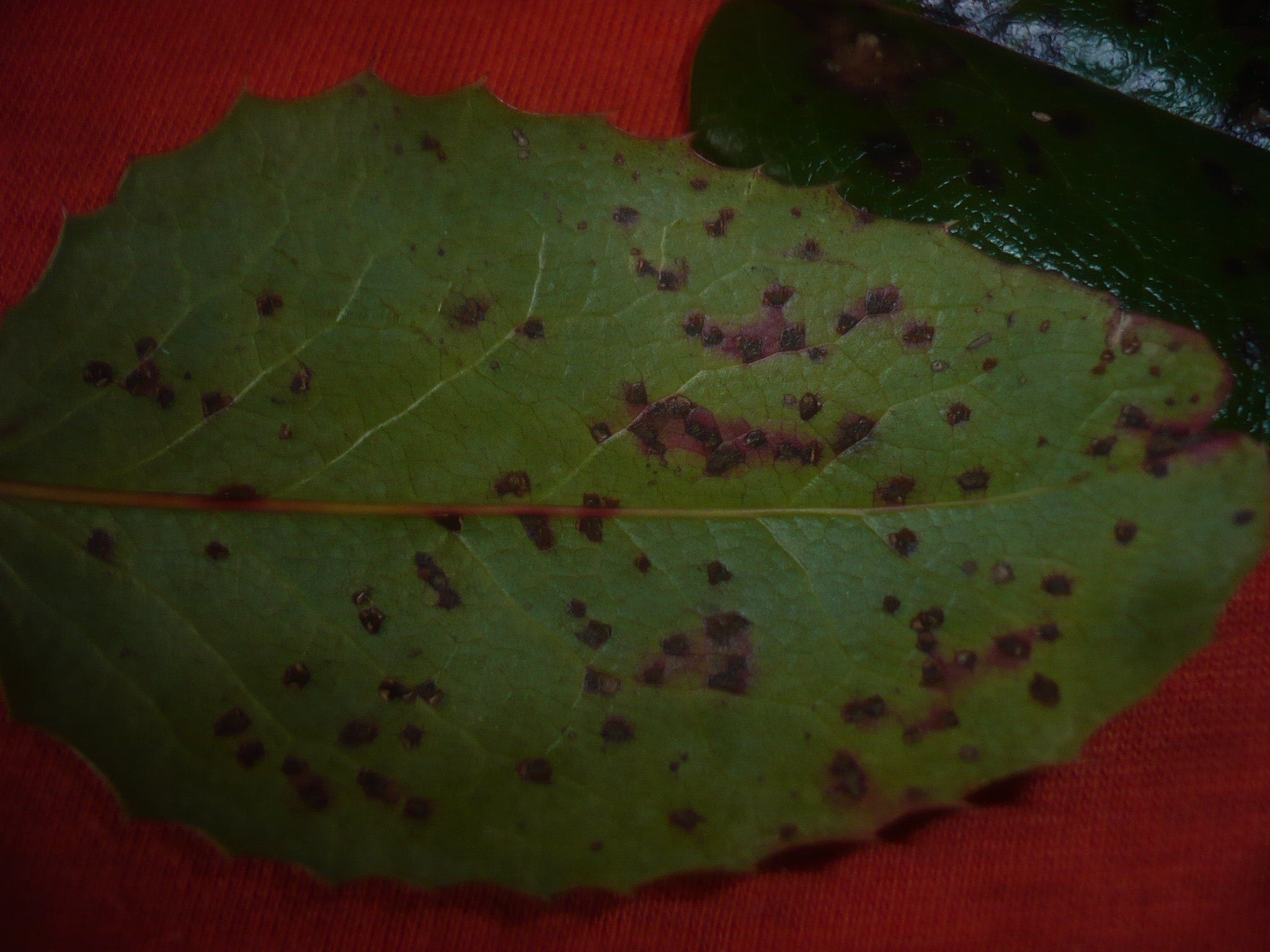
- One of the species in this genus is Cumminsiella mirabilissima now Cumminsiella sanguinea

Scientific classification
- Domain: Eukaryota
- Kingdom: Fungi
- Division: Basidiomycota
- Class: Pucciniomycetes
- Order: Pucciniales
- Family: Pucciniaceae
- Genus: Cumminsiella; Arthur

= Cumminsiella =

Genus of fungi

Cumminsiella is a genus of fungi belonging to the family Pucciniaceae.

The species of this genus are found in Europe, Northern America and Australia.

== Species ==
As accepted by GBIF:

- Cumminsiella antarctica (Speg.) J.W.Baxter
- Cumminsiella santa J.W.McCain & J.F.Hennen
- Cumminsiella standleyana Cummins
- Cumminsiella stolpiana (Magnus) J.W.Baxter
- Cumminsiella texana (Holw. & Long) Arthur
- Cumminsiella umbrosa J.F.Hennen & Cummins
- Cumminsiella wootoniana (Arthur) Arthur

Former species; Cumminsiella mirabilissima (Peck) Nannf. (1947) now Cumminsiella sanguinea
