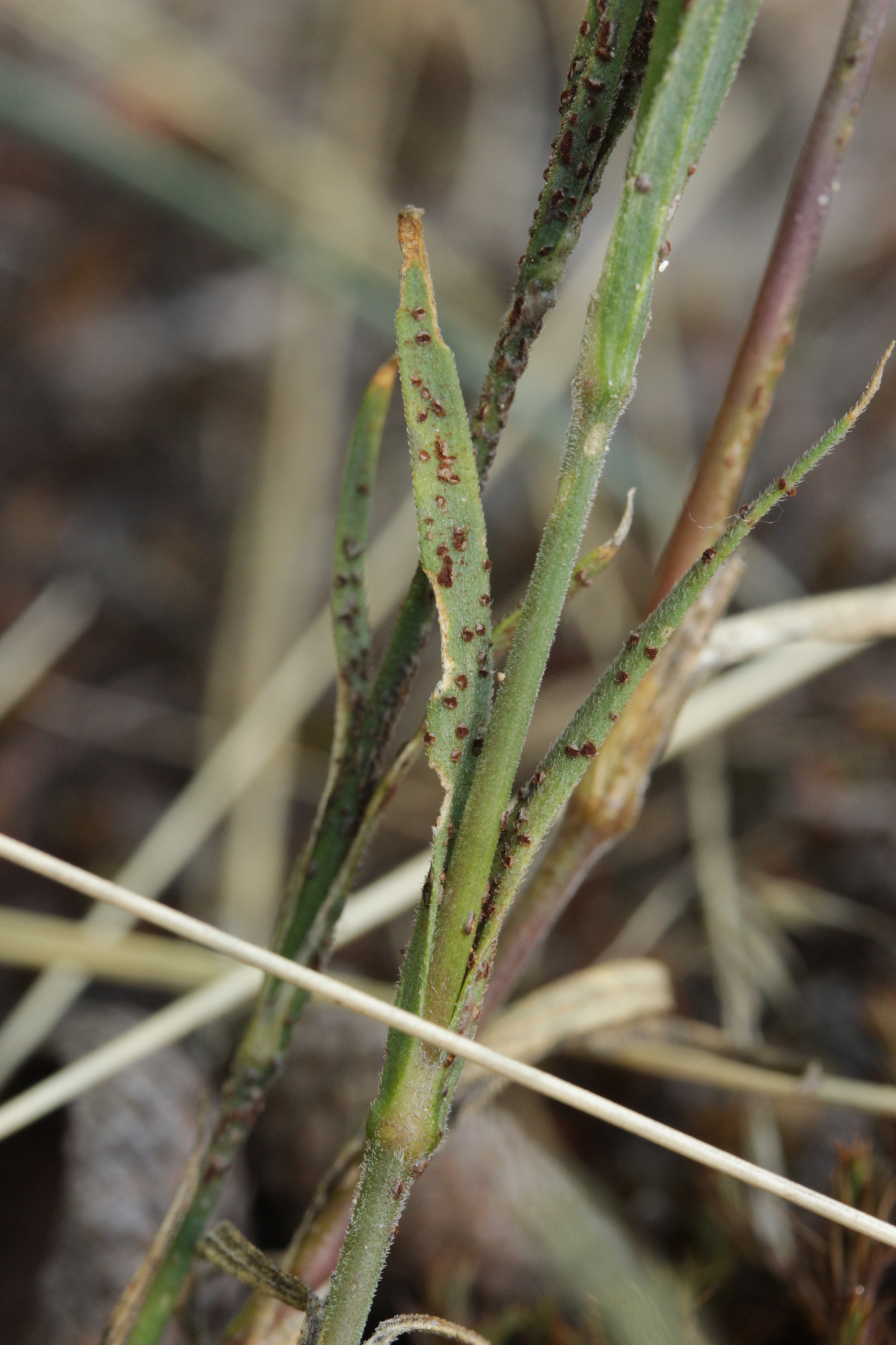
- on Dianthus deltoides

Scientific classification
- Kingdom: Fungi
- Division: Basidiomycota
- Class: Pucciniomycetes
- Order: Pucciniales
- Family: Pucciniaceae
- Genus: Uromyces
- Species: U. dianthi

Binomial name
- Uromyces dianthi (Pers.) Niessl, (1872)

Synonyms
- Caeoma dianthi (Pers.) Link, in Willdenow, Sp. pl., Edn 4 6(2): 26 (1825); Coeomurus caryophyllinus (Schrank) Kuntze, Revis. gen. pl. (Leipzig) 3(3): 449 (1898); Lycoperdon caryophyllinum Schrank, Baier. Fl. (München) 2: 668 (1789); Nigredo caryophyllina (Schrank) Arthur, N. Amer. Fl. (New York) 7(3): 246 (1920); Uredo dianthi Pers., Syn. meth. fung. (Göttingen) 1: 222 (1801); Uromyces caryophyllinus (Schrank) J. Schröt., Pilze 1(1): 149 (1884)

= Uromyces dianthi =

Species of fungus

Uromyces dianthi is a fungus species and plant pathogen infecting carnations and Euphorbia.

It was originally published as Uredo dianthi by mycologist Christiaan Hendrik Persoon in 1801, before it was transferred to the Uromyces genus in 1872 by Gustav Niessl von Mayendorf.

It is known as Carnation rust, it appears as an irregular shaped yellowing of the leaf and stem. These shapes then becomes elongated, with raised brown pustules on the underside of leaves from which brown dust (the fungal spores) are emitted when rubbed. It can be spread by wind currents (infecting leaves through the stomata in damp conditions) and it can also overwinter in the soil.

It has been grown in lab conditions, from urediospores.
