= Uromyces oblongus =

Scientific classification
- Domain: Eukaryota
- Kingdom: Fungi
- Division: Basidiomycota
- Class: Pucciniomycetes
- Order: Pucciniales
- Family: Pucciniaceae
- Genus: Uromyces
- Species: U. oblongus

Binomial name
- Uromyces oblongus Vize (1877)

Species of fungus

Uromyces oblongus is a plant pathogen infecting alfalfa.
