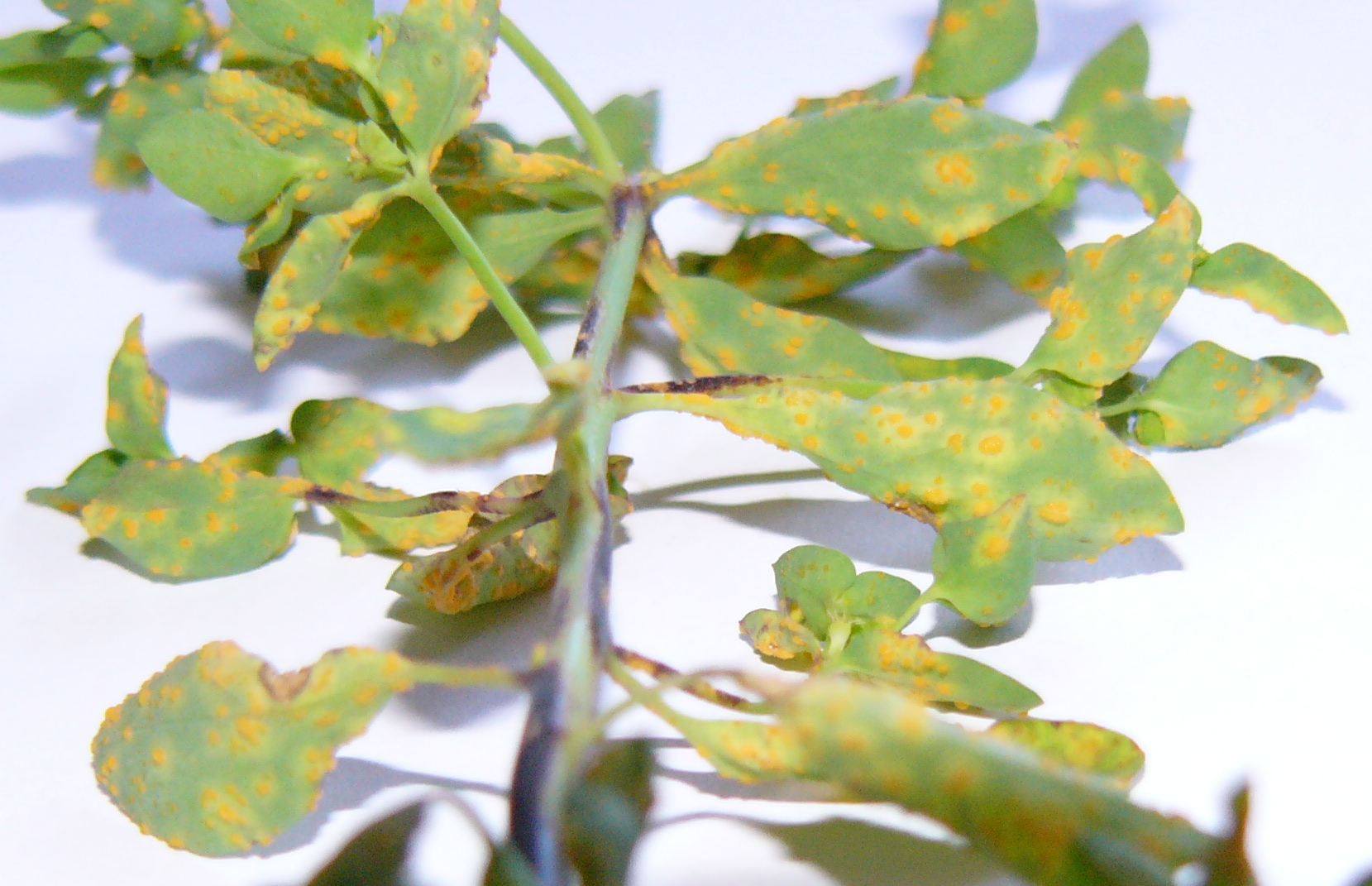
- Uromyces pisi-sativi on leaves of cypress spurge (Euphorbia cyparissias)

Scientific classification
- Kingdom: Fungi
- Division: Basidiomycota
- Class: Pucciniomycetes
- Order: Pucciniales
- Family: Pucciniaceae
- Genus: Uromyces (Link) Unger (1833)

Type species
- Uredo appendiculata Pers. (1796)

Synonyms
- Alveomyces Bubák, 1914; Capitularia Rabenh.; Coeomurus Gray; Dichlamys H.Sydow & P.Sydow, 1920; Groveola H.Sydow, 1921; Haplopyxis H.Sydow & P.Sydow, 1920; Haplotelium H.Sydow, 1922; Klebahnia J.C.Arthur, 1906; Nielsenia H.Sydow, 1921; Ontotelium H.Sydow, 1921; Poliotelium H.Sydow, 1922; Puccinella Fuckel, 1860; Pucciniola L.Marchand, 1829; Teleutospora J.C.Arthur & G.R.Bisby, 1921; Telospora J.C.Arthur, 1906; Uromycopsis J.C.Arthur, 1906

= Uromyces =

Genus of rust fungi

Uromyces is a genus of rust fungi in the family Pucciniaceae. The genus was erected by Franz Unger in his 1833 work Die Exantheme der Pflanzen. Species of the genus have a worldwide distribution but large occurrences happen in North America and Europe.

The genus is the second-largest plant pathogenic rust genus, which is responsible for various plant affecting diseases, and it has major effects on both agricultural and non-agricultural plants. The genus is generally characterized by its unicellular teliospores (thick-walled resting spores) that help to characterize it and distinguish it from another important and large rust genus, Puccinia.

The Uromyces fungal species have been recorded on various host plants belonging to a wide range of the families, including Asteraceae, Euphorbiaceae, Fabaceae, Liliaceae, Loranthaceae, and Poaceae. Family Loranthaceae is listed to be the most affected by the fungus.

== Species ==
As of 2023 August 22, the GBIF lists up to 1,048 species, while Species Fungorum lists about 1,239 species (with many former species). The Encyclopedia of Life lists 969 species.

Selected species in the genus Uromyces include:

- Uromyces apiosporus
- Uromyces appendiculatus
- Uromyces betae - beet rust
- Uromyces beticola - bean rust
- Uromyces ciceris-arietini - chickpea rust
- Uromyces dianthi carnation rust
- Uromyces elegans
- Uromyces euphorbiae
- Uromyces graminis
- Uromyces inconspicuus
- Uromyces medicaginis
- Uromyces musae
- Uromyces oblongus
- Uromyces pisi-sativi - pea rust
- Uromyces straitus - alfalfa or lucerne rust
- Uromyces trifolii-repentis - clover rust
- Uromyces vignae - cowpea rust
