= Teliospore =

Thick-walled resting spore of some fungi

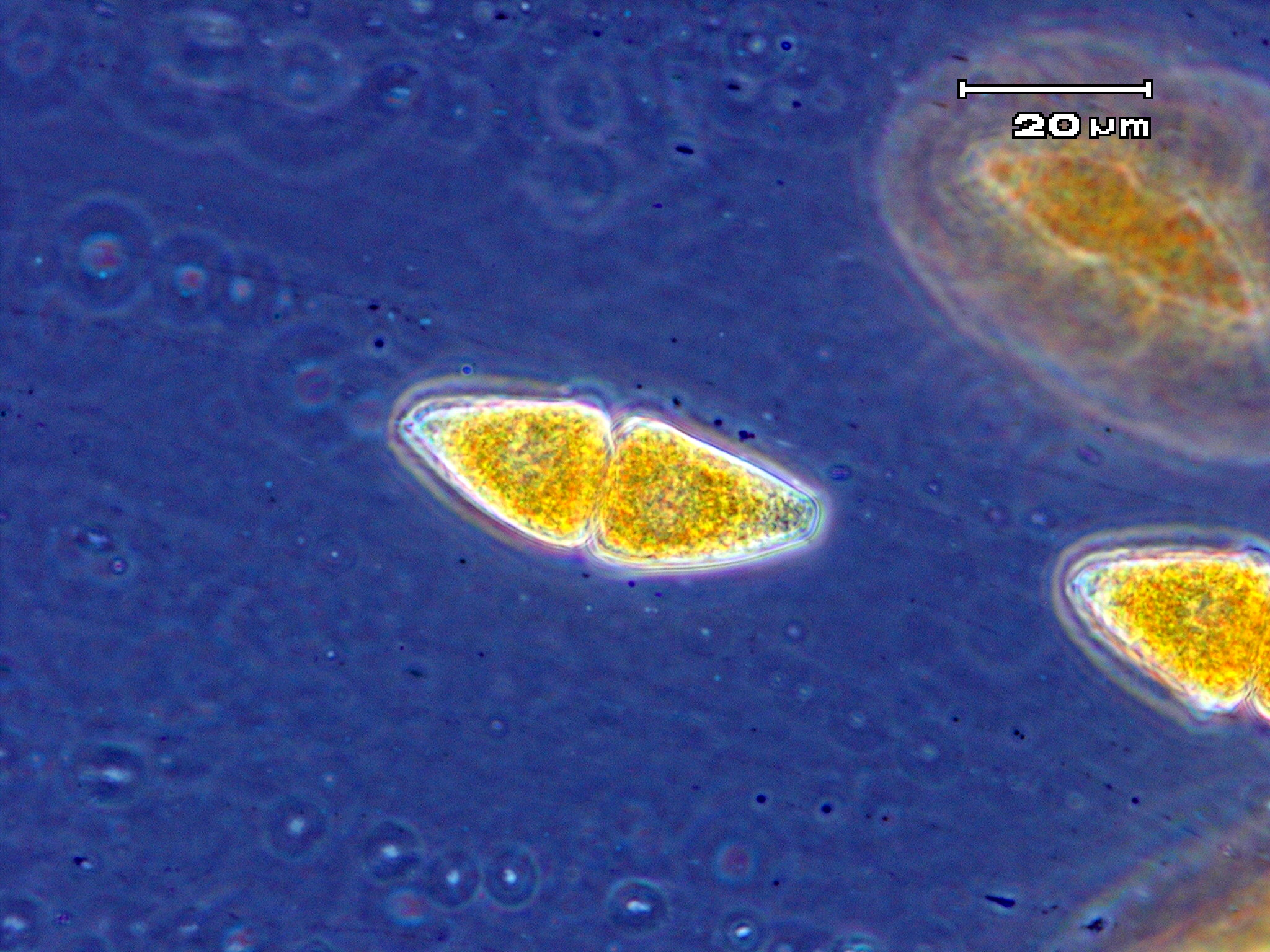
Two-celled teliospore of Gymnosporangium globosum

Teliospore (sometimes called teleutospore) is the thick-walled resting spore of some fungi (rusts and smuts), from which the basidium arises.

== Development ==
They develop in telia (sing. telium or teliosorus).

The telial host is the primary host in heteroecious rusts. The aecial host is the alternate host (look for pycnia and aecia).

These terms apply when two hosts are required by a heteroecious rust fungus to complete its life cycle.

== Morphology ==
Teliospores consist of one, two or more dikaryote cells.

Teliospores are often dark-coloured and thick-walled, especially in species where they overwinter (acting as chlamydospores).

Two-celled teliospores formerly defined the genus Puccinia. Here the wall is particularly thick at the tip of the terminal cell which extends into a beak in some species.

Teliospores consist of dikaryote cells. As the teliospore cells germinate, the nuclei undergo karyogamy and thereafter meiosis, giving rise to a four-celled basidium with haploid basidiospores.

== See also ==
- Aeciospore
- Chlamydospore
- Pycniospore
- Rust fungus § Spores
- Urediniomycetes
- Urediniospore
- Ustilaginomycetes
