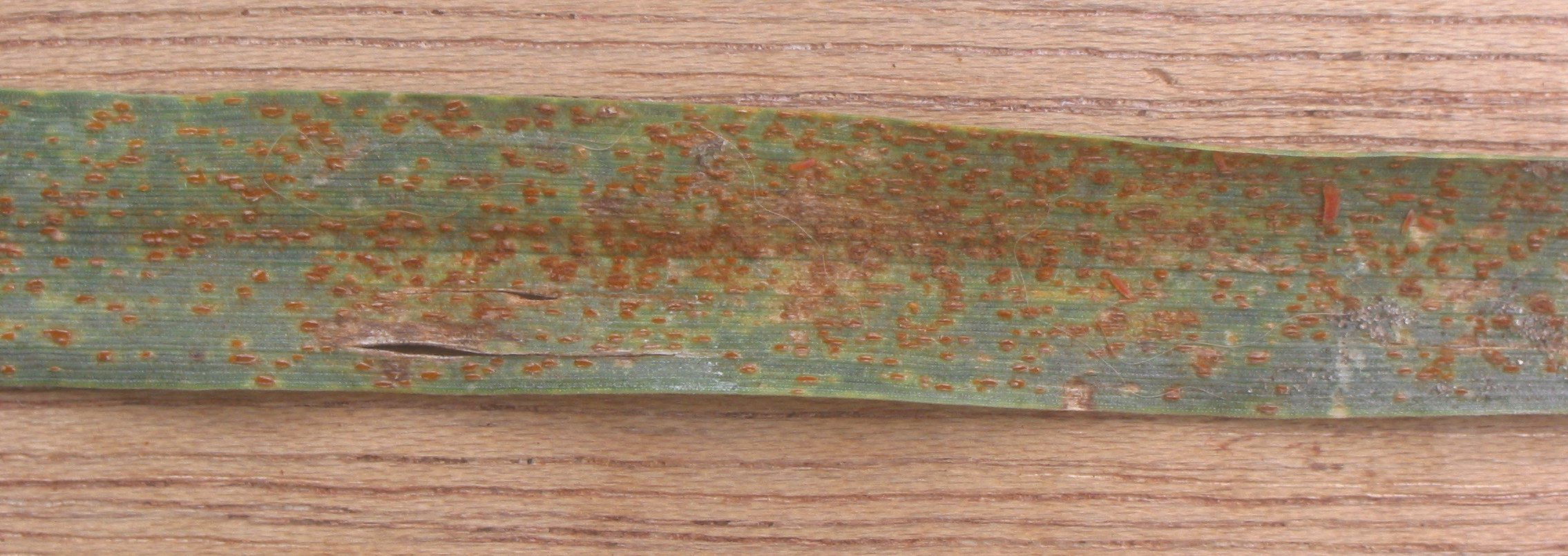
- Puccinia triticina

Scientific classification
- Kingdom: Fungi
- Division: Basidiomycota
- Class: Pucciniomycetes
- Order: Pucciniales
- Family: Pucciniaceae; Chevall. (1826)

Type genus
- Puccinia Pers. (1794)

= Pucciniaceae =

Family of fungi

The Pucciniaceae are a family of rust fungi that cause plant diseases, mainly on cereals such as wheat. The family contains over 4900 species: many of them in the type genus Puccinia.

== Genera ==
Genera in the Pucciniaceae (with estimated numbers of species):

- Allodus Arthur (1)
- Chrysella Syd. (1)
- Chrysocelis Syd. (5)
- Chrysocyclus Syd. (3)
- Chrysopsora Lagerh. (1)
- Cleptomyces Arthur (1)
- Coleopucciniella Hara ex Hirats. (2)
- Corbulopsora Cummins (3)
- Cumminsiella Arthur (8)
- Endophyllum Lév. (43)
- Kernella Thirum. (1)
- Miyagia Miyabe ex Syd. & P. Syd. (3)
- Polioma Arthur (5)
- Puccinia Pers. (ca. 3300)
- Ramakrishnania Ramachar & Bhagyan. (1)
- Roestelia Rebent. (15)
- Stereostratum Magnus (1)
- Uredo Pers. (ca. 780)
- Uromyces (Link) Unger (ca. 1500)
- Xenostele Syd. & P. Syd. (4)

Note: the genus Zaghouania Pat. (synonym Cystopsora E.J. Butler) is now placed to the restored family Zaghouaniaceae.
