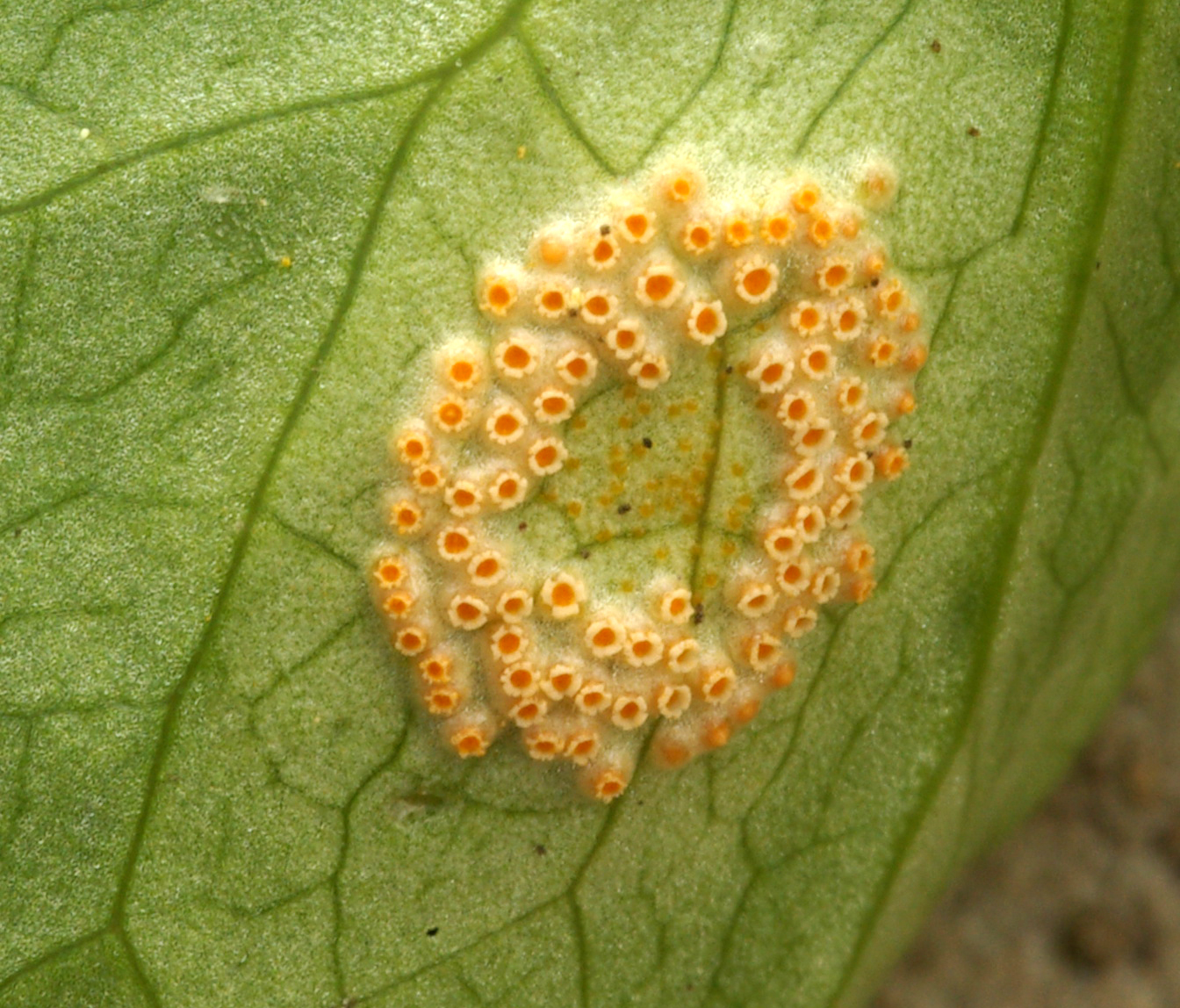
- Aecia of Puccinia sessilis on Arum maculatum leaf

Scientific classification
- Kingdom: Fungi
- Division: Basidiomycota
- Subdivision: Pucciniomycotina
- Class: Pucciniomycetes; R. Bauer, Begerow, J.P. Samp., M. Weiss & Oberw. (2006)

Orders
- Helicobasidiales; Pachnocybales; Platygloeales; Pucciniales; Septobasidiales

Synonyms
- Pucciniomycetes D.Hawksw., B.Sutton & Ainsw. (1983)

= Pucciniomycetes =

Class of fungi

Pucciniomycetes (formerly known as Urediniomycetidae) is a diverse class of fungi in the subphylum Pucciniomycotina of phylum Basidiomycota. The class contains 5 orders, 21 families, 190 genera, and approximately 8,016 species. It has been estimated that this class contains about one third of all teleomorphic basidiomycetes. Pucciniomycetes contains many economically important plant pathogenic fungal rusts; the order Pucciniales (formerly Uredinales) is the largest clade in this class, representing approximately 7,000 species.

Pucciniomycetes are cosmopolitan and can be found in both terrestrial and aquatic environments, although aquatic species are poorly understood.

== Characteristics ==
Species in the class Pucciniomycetes develop no basidiocarp, karyogamy occurs in a thick-walled resting spore (teliospore), and meiosis occurs upon germination of the teliospore. They have simple septal pores without membrane caps, and disc-like spindle pole bodies. Except for a few species, the basidia, when present, are transversely septate. Mannose is the major cell-wall carbohydrate; glucose, fucose, and rhamnose are the less prevalent neutral sugars; and xylose is not present.

== Taxonomy ==
The class Pucciniomycetes was first defined as a monophyletic group in 1995. Pucciniomycetes contains rust fungi, the order Septobasidiales, teliospore-forming yeasts, and various species that were once classified as smut or jelly fungi.
