= Hemileia coffeicola =

Scientific classification
- Domain: Eukaryota
- Kingdom: Fungi
- Division: Basidiomycota
- Class: Pucciniomycetes
- Order: Pucciniales
- Family: Zaghouaniaceae
- Genus: Hemileia
- Species: H. coffeicola

Binomial name
- Hemileia coffeicola Maubl. & Roger, (1934)

Synonyms
- Uredo coffeicola Maubl. & Roger, (1934)

Species of fungus

Hemileia coffeicola is a plant pathogen which infects coffee plantations in central to western Africa, particularly in Cameroon and São Tomé and Príncipe.

== Description ==
Hemileia coffeicola is a grey or orange rust fungus whose urediniospores are ornamented with warts or spines. Its sori are found scattered over leaf surfaces particularly on the entire underside of the leaf giving it the appearance of powdery blotches. It can be distinguished from the very similar Hemileia vastatrix by the way in which the sori are scattered over the leaf surface rather than being found in distinct patches. The presence hyphae measuring up to 20–30 μm in diameter can also be used to distinguish H. coffeicola from H. vastatrix. It was first recorded on Coffea arabica in Cameroon in 1932. Infected leaves eventually turn yellow and are desiccated.
