= Aplopsora =

Scientific classification
- Kingdom: Fungi
- Division: Basidiomycota
- Class: Pucciniomycetes
- Order: Pucciniales
- Family: Chaconiaceae
- Genus: Aplopsora; Mains (1921)

Type species
- Aplopsora nyssae Mains (1921)

Species
- A. corni A. dicentrae A. hennenii A. nyssae A. qualeae A. tanakae

Genus of fungi

Aplopsora is a genus of rust fungi in the Chaconiaceae family. The genus contains about six species.
