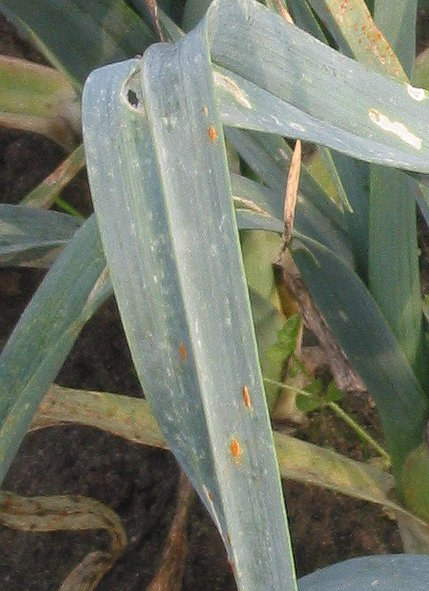
- Puccinia porri growing on leek (Allium porrum)

Scientific classification
- Kingdom: Fungi
- Division: Basidiomycota
- Class: Pucciniomycetes
- Order: Pucciniales
- Family: Pucciniaceae
- Genus: Puccinia
- Species: P. porri

Binomial name
- Puccinia porri (Sowerby) G.Winter (1881)

Synonyms
- List: Uredo porri Sowerby (1809); Coeomurus porri (Sowerby) Gray (1821); Dicaeoma porri (Sowerby) Kuntze (1898); Xyloma allii DC. (1815); Puccinia allii (DC.) F.Rudolphi (1829); Dicaeoma allii (DC.) Kuntze (1898); Uredo alliorum DC.(1815); Uromyces alliorum (DC.) Lév. (1847); Puccinia alliorum (DC.) Casp. (1857); Xyloma allii var. foliorum DC. (1815); Xyloma allii var. scapi DC. (1815); Puccinia mixta Fuckel (1870); Puccinia blasdalei Dietel & Holw. (1893); Uromyces durus Dietel (1907)

= Puccinia porri =

Fungus that causes leek rust

Puccinia porri (previously known as Puccinia allii) is a species of rust fungus that causes leek rust. It affects leek, garlic, onion, and chives, and usually appears as bright orange spots on infected plants.

== Fungus ==
Puccinia porri is autoecious, meaning that all stages of its life cycle occur on the host plant. While P. porri and P. mixta were originally thought to be separate species, by 1984 they were all generally categorized under P. allii. The fungus causes leek rust, but it also affects garlic, onion, and chives. In 2016, Alistair McTaggart and colleagues used molecular phylogenetic analysis to sort out collections of fungi labeled as Puccinia allii occurring in Australia, and placed this name in synonymy with Puccinia porri.

== Conditions for growth ==
Leek rust appears seasonally, starting in the middle of August. It develops more quickly in warmer weather, so conversely, cold spells can reduce the onset of symptoms. If a leek reaches maturation closer to winter, it is more susceptible to infection, whereas a leek that matures earlier in the fall must be wet to endure a heavy attack. According to the Royal Horticultural Society, there are no fungicides approved for use by amateur gardeners to combat leek rust. However, in practice there are different fungicides that are recommended for use in different countries, depending on the Allium crop. For example, in Ethiopia, the fungicides mancozeb, propiconazole, tebuconazole or azoxystrobin are approved for use to control the fungus. They will control the rust if sprayed on the plant at 10-day intervals.

== Symptoms of infection ==
On leeks, P. porri manifests as bright orange or yellow pustules on the upper parts of the leaves, usually between veins. Sometimes, the pustules grow to network with each other and spread to the base of the leaf. The aeciospores are between 19 and 28 micrometers in diameter, with yellow walls 1 to 2 micrometers in length. The urediniospores are more elliptical in shape, with a major axis diameter of 22–32 micrometers and a minor axis diameter of 20–26 micrometers. The teliospores are also elliptical, with a major axis diameter of 28–45 micrometers and a minor axis diameter of 20–26 micrometers.

=== Economic damage ===
An infected leek's discolouring can cause it to lose market value, as there is an expectation the vegetables do not have visual defects or flaws. The infection can also slow and reduce the growth of the plant. In addition, Uma (1984) writes that P. porri has caused significant losses for garlic farmers in California, Israel, South Africa, and Brazil.
