= Maravalia =

Scientific classification
- Kingdom: Fungi
- Division: Basidiomycota
- Class: Pucciniomycetes
- Order: Pucciniales
- Family: Chaconiaceae
- Genus: Maravalia; Arthur (1922)

Type species
- Maravalia pallida Arthur & Thaxt. ex Arthur (1922)

Synonyms
- Argomycetella Syd. (1922); Scopella Mains (1939); Acervulopsora Thirum. (1945); Scopellopsis T.S.Ramakr. & K.Ramakr. (1947); Mapea Boedijn (1957); Angusia G.F.Laundon (1964); Telomapea G.F.Laundon (1967)

Genus of fungi

Maravalia is a genus of rust fungi in the Chaconiaceae family. The widespread genus contains about 35 species that grow on angiosperms.

== Species ==
As accepted by Species Fungorum;

- Maravalia achroa (P. Syd. & Syd.) Arthur & Cummins (1937)
- Maravalia africana Gjaerum (1978)
- Maravalia allophyli Berndt & F.O. Freire (2004)
- Maravalia amazonensis (F.C. Albuq.) Y. Ono (1984)
- Maravalia ascotela (Syd.) Mains (1938)
- Maravalia aulica (Syd.) Y. Ono (1984)
- Maravalia bauhiniicola (Cummins) Y. Ono (1984)
- Maravalia bolivarensis Y. Ono (1984)
- Maravalia crotalariae Syd. (1937)
- Maravalia cryptostegiae (Vestergr.) Y. Ono (1984)
- Maravalia echinulata (Niessl ex Rabenh.) Y. Ono (1984)
- Maravalia elata (Syd. & P. Syd.) Mains (1939)
- Maravalia erythroxyli (Viégas) Y. Ono & J.F. Hennen (1984)
- Maravalia exigua Y. Ono (1984)
- Maravalia fici (Mundk. & Thirum.) Y. Ono (1984)
- Maravalia fusiformis Y. Ono, Kakish. & Lohsomb. (1988)
- Maravalia gentilis (Syd.) Y. Ono (1984)
- Maravalia guianensis Y. Ono (1984)
- Maravalia hygrophilae (Syd., P. Syd. & E.J. Butler) Mains (1938)
- Maravalia ichnocarpi (Barclay) Sathe (1971)
- Maravalia kevorkianii (Cummins) Cummins & Y. Hirats. (1983)
- Maravalia limoniformis McTaggart, Y. Ono, Berndt & R.G. Shivas (2008)
- Maravalia lonchocarpi (G.F. Laundon) Y. Ono (1984)
- Maravalia lucumae (Dietel) Y. Ono (1984)
- Maravalia manettiae Jørst. (1959)
- Maravalia millettiae Yadav & Thirum. (1956)
- Maravalia milletticola Y. Ono & J.F. Hennen (1984)
- Maravalia mimusops (Cooke) Y. Ono (1984)
- Maravalia palaquii (Cummins) Y. Ono (1984)
- Maravalia pallida Arthur & Thaxt. ex Arthur (1922)
- Maravalia payenae (Racib.) Y. Ono (1984)
- Maravalia perae A.A. Carvalho & J.F. Hennen (2009)
- Maravalia pressa (Arthur & Holw.) Mains (1939)
- Maravalia pseudosuprastomatalis Y. Ono & Kakish. (1988)
- Maravalia pterocarpi (Thirum.) Thirum. (1949)
- Maravalia pura (Syd.) Mains (1939)
- Maravalia quadrilobata (J.F. Hennen & Cummins) Y. Ono (1984)
- Maravalia ramacharii Ravinder & Bagyan. (1994)
- Maravalia sapotae (Mains ex Cummins) Y. Ono (1984)
- Maravalia sebastianiae J.C. Lindq. (1951)
- Maravalia swartziae Y. Ono (1984)
- Maravalia utriculata Syd. (1925)

Former species;

- M. albescens (Syd. & P. Syd.) Syd. (1924) = Chaconia alutacea, Chaconiaceae
- M. hyalospora (Sawada) Dietel (1924) = Endoraecium hyalosporum, Endoraeciaceae
- M. ingae Syd. (1925) = Chaconia ingae, Chaconiaceae
