= Olivea =

Scientific classification
- Kingdom: Fungi
- Division: Basidiomycota
- Class: Pucciniomycetes
- Order: Pucciniales
- Family: Chaconiaceae
- Genus: Olivea; Arthur (1917)

Type species
- Olivea capituliformis (Henn.) Arthur (1917)

Species
- O. capituliformis O. colebrookiana O. fimbriata O. isonandrae O. petitiae O. scitula O. tectonae O. viticis

Synonyms
- Tegillum Mains (1940)

Genus of fungi

Olivea is a genus of rust fungi in the family Chaconiaceae. The widespread genus contains eight species that grow on dicots, especially the tropical flowering plant family Verbenaceae.

The genus name of Olivea is in honour of Edgar William Olive (1870-1971), who was an American botanist (Algology and Mycology) who was a Professor of Botany at the University of Wisconsin–Madison and Harvard University.

The genus was circumscribed by Joseph Charles Arthur in Mycologia vol.9 on page 62 in 1917.

== Species ==
As accepted by GBIF;

- Olivea capituliformis (Henn.) Arthur
- Olivea colebrookeae (Barclay) Thirum. & Yadav
- Olivea fimbriata (Mains) Cummins & Y.Hirats.
- Olivea isonandrae Hosag.
- Olivea petitiae Arthur
- Olivea scitula Syd.
- Olivea tectonae (Racib.) Thirum.
- Olivea viticis Y.Ono & J.F.Hennen
