= Chaconia =

Chaconia may refer to:

- Warszewiczia coccinea, a flowering plant species
- Chaconia (fungus), a rust fungus genus in the family Chaconiaceae
