= Goplana (fungus) =

Scientific classification
- Kingdom: Fungi
- Division: Basidiomycota
- Class: Pucciniomycetes
- Order: Pucciniales
- Family: Chaconiaceae
- Genus: Goplana; Racib. (1900)

Type species
- Goplana micheliae Racib. (1900)

Genus of fungi

Goplana is a genus of rust fungi in the Chaconiaceae family. The widespread genus contains 12 species that grow on dicots.

== Species ==
- Goplana andina
- Goplana aporosae
- Goplana australis
- Goplana cissi
- Goplana concinna
- Goplana dioscoreae
- Goplana ecuadorica
- Goplana espeletiae
- Goplana indica
- Goplana micheliae
- Goplana mirabilis
- Goplana ribis-andicolae
