= Achrotelium =

Scientific classification
- Kingdom: Fungi
- Division: Basidiomycota
- Class: Pucciniomycetes
- Order: Pucciniales
- Family: Zaghouaniaceae
- Genus: Achrotelium; Syd. (1928)

Type species
- Achrotelium ichnocarpi Syd. (1928)

Species
- A. hemidesmi A. ichnocarpi A. lucumae A. rhodesicum A. urerae

Genus of fungi

Achrotelium is a genus of rust fungi in family Zaghouaniaceae. The genus, previously placed in the Chaconiaceae, contains five species that are found in the USA, Philippines, India, and Zimbabwe.
