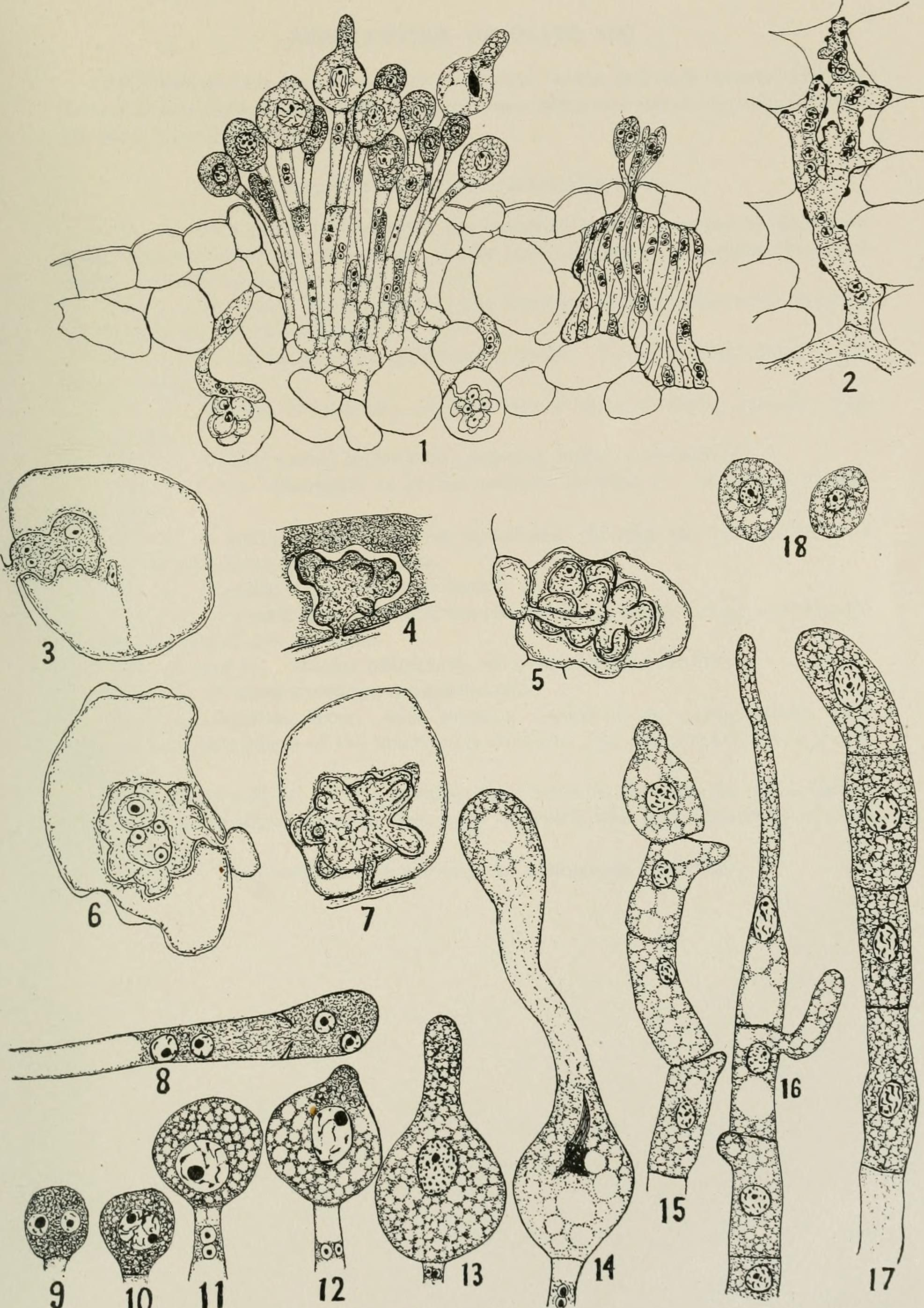
- Cytological structures of Botryorhiza

Scientific classification
- Kingdom: Fungi
- Division: Basidiomycota
- Class: Pucciniomycetes
- Order: Pucciniales
- Family: Zaghouaniaceae
- Genus: Botryorhiza; Whetzel & Olive (1917)

Type species
- Botryorhiza hippocrateae Whetzel & Olive (1917)

= Botryorhiza =

Genus of fungi

Botryorhiza is a genus of rust fungi in the family Zaghouaniaceae. The genus, previously placed in the Chaconiaceae, is monotypic, containing the single species Botryorhiza hippocrateae, which grows on Hippocratea plants in Brazil and the Caribbean.
