= Starmaya coffee =

First F1 Hybrid coffee tree propagated by seeds

- Species: Coffea arabica
- Hybrid parentage: CIR-SM01 x Marsellesa
- Breeder: CIRAD
- Origin: Nicaragua

Coffee Variety Information
- Stature: Dwarf
- Leaf Tip Color: Green
- Bean Size: Large
- Quality Potential: Very Good
- Yield Potential: High
- Coffee Leaf Rust: Resistant
- Coffee Berry Disease (CBD): Unknown
- Nematodes: Unknown

Starmaya is an F1 hybrid coffee tree that can be propagated by seed rather than through somatic embryogenesis (SE). It was propagated from a parent plant that is male-sterile. This facilitates controlled pollination because breeders do not have to manually castrate each individual flower of the autogamous coffee tree.

The Starmaya tree was found to have a high fruit yield potential, resistance to coffee leaf rust, and the potential (when grown at higher altitudes) to produce a beverage of very good quality. It was also found to be effectively propagated in a seed garden. Starmaya is the first F1 hybrid coffee tree effectively propagated by seed garden, proving a cheaper and easier method of F1 hybrid propagation than the more expensive and technically difficult SE method.

Starmaya coffee is being registered for intellectual property rights protection through the International Union for the Protection of New Varieties of Plants (UPOV).

== Coffee breeding and male-sterility ==
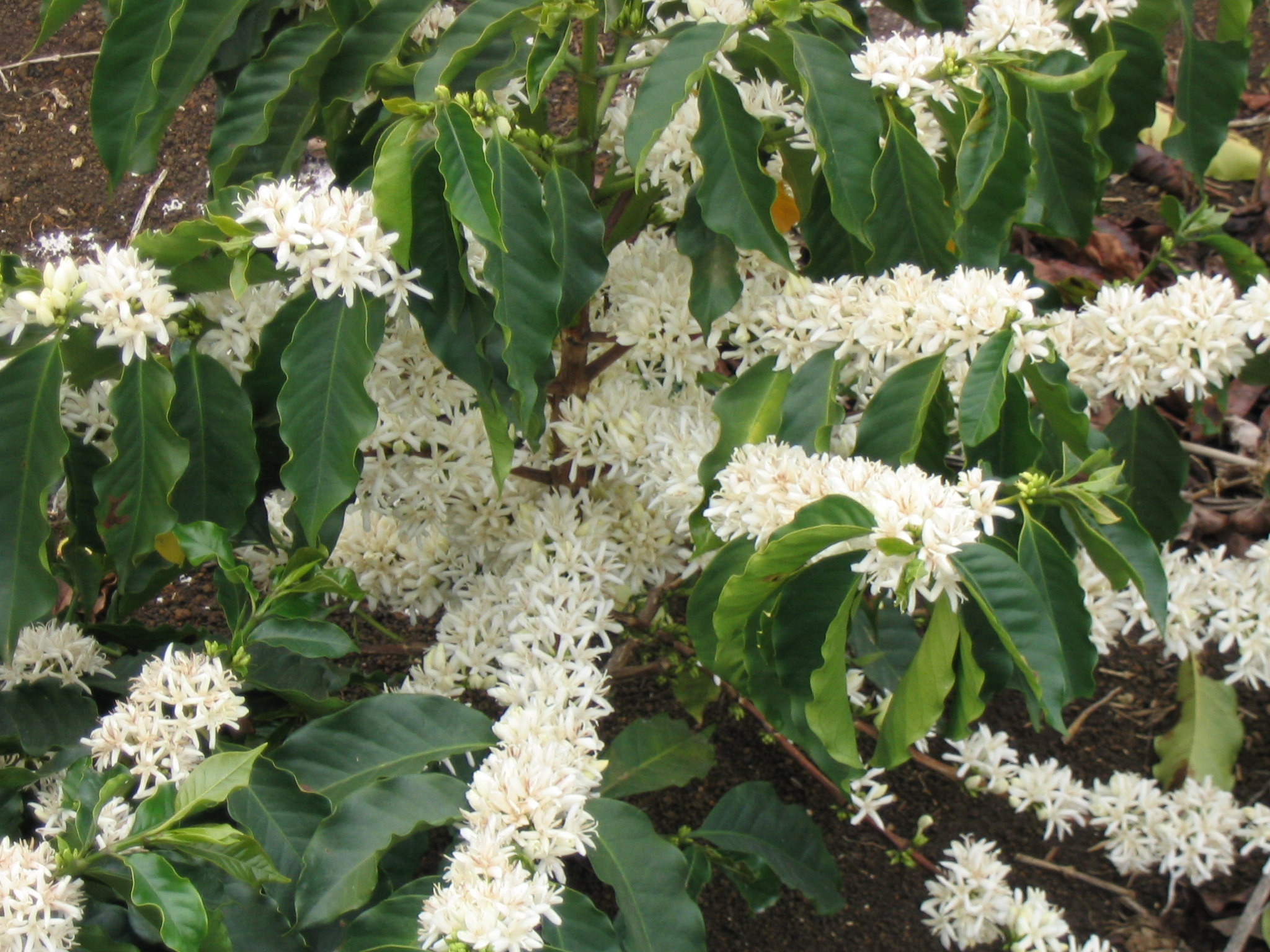
There can be dozens of individual flowers on each branch of the coffee tree.

Coffee is an autogamous plant, which means it can self-pollinate and thus breed with itself. For breeders, this presents a challenge when trying to control pollination. To overcome this challenge, breeders must castrate each flower by hand (there can be dozens of flowers per branch of a coffee tree). After collecting specific pollen from pollen-donor trees, breeders manually pollinate the castrated flowers by brushing pollen onto the female parts (the pistil). According to Georget and colleagues in "Starmaya: The First Arabica F1 Coffee Hybrid Produced Using Genetic Male Sterility," plant breeding techniques that overcome this difficulty could reduce production costs and make these hybrids more widely available.

Breeding self-pollinating plants by leveraging male-sterile parents is routinely done in other cash crops to produce F1 hybrids. However, Starmaya represents the first known use of male-sterility in producing F1 hybrids of coffee trees.

Male-sterile parents for breeding is a central aspect to utilizing seed gardens for propagating F1 hybrids of self-pollinating species. However, when breeding occurs in the field (in situ), care must still be taken to avoid pollination from nearby trees that are not part of the program. The design and ultimate setup of the seed garden can help reduce alien pollination through the use of isolation distances, insect (pollinator) control, etc.

== History ==
=== Development of Starmaya ===
Starmaya Cupping Scores
Aroma	7.63
Flavor	7.63
Aftertaste	7.63
Acidity	7.5
Body	7.5
Uniformity	10
Clean cup	10
Balance	7.63
Sweetness	8.88
General impression	7.63
Final score	82.5
Source: Georget et al. — 2019

In 2001, a team of researchers from the French Agricultural Research Centre for International Development (CIRAD) noticed a tall-growing natural mutant of Coffea arabica called CIR-SM01 that did not produce any pollen (male-sterile). Male-sterile plants can be used as mother plants in breeding programs because breeders do not have to remove the male parts of the flower. Researchers verified the stability of the mutation causing male-sterility by cloning CIR-SM01 using somatic embryogenesis. They also verified that the mutation is a recessive trait, meaning both parents must have the trait in order for it to be expressed in offspring (this means that Starmaya is not a male-sterile plant, even though one of its parent plants is).

CIR-SM01 was then crossed with four different dwarf-type cultivars (Caturra red, Catuai 44, IAPAR59, and Marsellesa) used as pollen donors to test the possibility of producing F1 hybrid seeds. The researchers found that the cross between CIR-SM01 and Marsellesa (a variety also developed by CIRAD), which was eventually named Starmaya yielded 30% more green beans than the parent Marsellesa, with good beverage quality and also resistance to coffee leaf rust.

=== Cup quality ===
Beverage quality in the specialty coffee industry is determined by a protocol generally called cupping. This process evaluates a coffee on several different sensory descriptors including fragrance, flavor, aftertaste, acidity, body, balance, etc., rating each on a scale of 0–100. Any coffee rated 80 or above is considered specialty coffee. In the study, Starmaya received an overall rating of 82.5 compared to 83.13 for the parent plant Marsellesa and 82.9 for a control plant Caturra red.

=== Rust resistance ===
Coffee leaf rust is the most economically important diseases of coffee, worldwide. The most effective and durable strategy against CLR is the use of resistant cultivars. And while Starmaya was a proof of concept for mass production of F1 hybrid seeds, the researchers also evaluated its ability to resist rust infection.

One of the parent plants used in the study, Marsellesa, was observed in the field to be 1% susceptible to rust and the Starmaya plant was observed to be 8% susceptible. The researchers believe that Starmaya's resistance can be improved by first increasing the genetic fixedness (predictability of trait inheritance by progeny, i.e., a "fixed-line") of Marsellesa. The high levels of rust incidence in Starmaya for this study were also partially attributed to alien pollination during the initial breeding trial.

=== Seed Garden ===
The seed garden was set up using CIR-SM01 as the male-sterile parent, or pollen receiver and Marsellesa as the intended pollen donor at a rate of 1:4 (receiver:donor). The planting density of the plot was 2 meters between rows and 1.5 meters between plants within the same row. This density allows for 4,000 trees per hectare. This configuration established efficient, natural pollination.

Seeds derived from the seed garden were successfully cultivated as F1 Hybrids, demonstrating that a seed garden is capable of producing F1 hybrids of this form at roughly half the cost of somatic embryogenesis. (Note: Not only is the process of somatic embryogenesis expensive for breeders, but the resultant plant stock is more expensive for producers (breeders pass on the cost). The added cost can be US$0.50 - $0.60 per tree which could mean $2,500 - $3,000 per hectare in extra costs to use F1 hybrids produced with SE.) It is estimated that a seed garden could effectively produce a half-million F1 hybrid seeds per hectare, per year.

The democratization of use of F1 hybrids becomes more realistic with the reduced cost and technical difficulties of using a seed garden to propagate F1 hybrids.
