= Douglas Barton Osborne Savile =

Canadian biologist (1909–2000)

Douglas Barton Osborne Savile (July 19, 1909 – August 1, 2000) was an Irish-born Canadian mycologist, plant pathologist and evolutionary biologist. He is particularly renowned for his unique work on the coevolution of host plants and their rust fungi.

Doug Savile was born in Dublin, and went to elementary school in tropical Africa and secondary school in England. He graduated from Macdonald College of McGill University in Quebec in 1934 (M.Sc.), and took 1939 his PhD from the University of Michigan under the supervision of Edwin Butterworth Mains. His thesis was on nuclear structure and behaviour in species of the Uredinales. 1939–1943 he served in the Royal Canadian Air Force during World War II. Upon his return, he was employed in the Division of Botany and Plant Pathology at the Central Experimental Farm of the Department of Agriculture. He mainly worked on diseases of ornamental plants. From 1949, he went on numerous expeditions to the Canadian Arctic. He retired from Agriculture Canada in 1974.

== Honours ==
Savile was a fellow of the Royal Society of Canada and a member of the American Association for the Advancement of Science. He was awarded the George Lawson Medal, the highest award presented by the Canadian Botanical Association and the Distinguished Mycologist Award from the Mycological Society of America (in 1988). In 1978, he was made honorary doctor at McGill University.

== Research ==
Among his scientific works, his studies of coevolution of Saxifragaceae, Poaceae, Cyperaceae, Juncaceae and their respective rust fungi stand out. He showed that since closely related pathogenic fungi tend to prefer closely related host plants, fungi could serve as an aid to plant taxonomy and vice versa.

During the 1960s and 1970s, he published some 80 papers on parasitic fungi of a number of plant families: Saxifragaceae, Portulacaceae, Onagraceae, Apiaceae, Scrophulariaceae, Asteraceae, Liliaceae, Cyperaceae, Juncaceae and Poaceae. He also wrote regional mycofloras of the Arctic, Nova Scotia and British Columbia.

He studied splashcup dispersal of peridioles in Nidulariales and of seeds from the capsules of Chrysosplenium and Mitella.

His monograph on adaptations in arctic plants still stands as a landmark.

== Sources ==
- Parmelee J.A. (2001). "Douglas Barton Osborne Savile B.S.A., M.Sc., PhD, D.Sc., FRSC., 1909–2000". Mycologia. 93 (4): 807–813. doi:10.1080/00275514.2001.12063213. JSTOR 3761836.
- Ginns J., Darbyshire S. (2001). "A Tribute to Douglas Barton Osbourne Savile, 1909–2000". Canadian Field-Naturalist. 155: 357–364.
