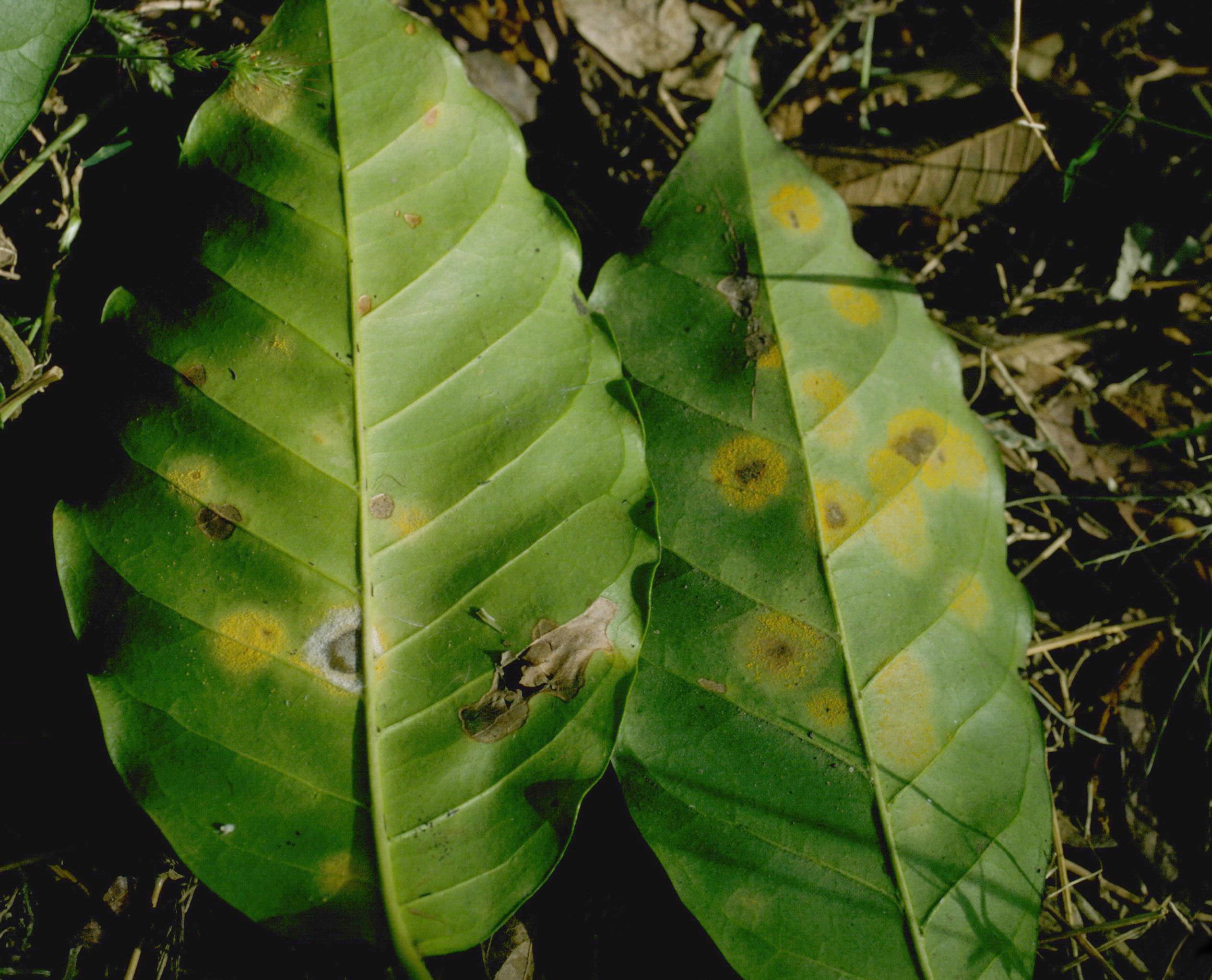
- Symptoms of coffee rust caused by Hemileia vastatrix on foliage

Scientific classification
- Kingdom: Fungi
- Division: Basidiomycota
- Class: Pucciniomycetes
- Order: Pucciniales
- Family: Zaghouaniaceae
- Genus: Hemileia
- Species: H. vastatrix

Binomial name
- Hemileia vastatrix Berk. & Broome (1869)

Synonyms
- Wardia vastatrix J.F.Hennen & M.M.Hennen (2003)

= Hemileia vastatrix =

Species of fungus that infects coffee plants

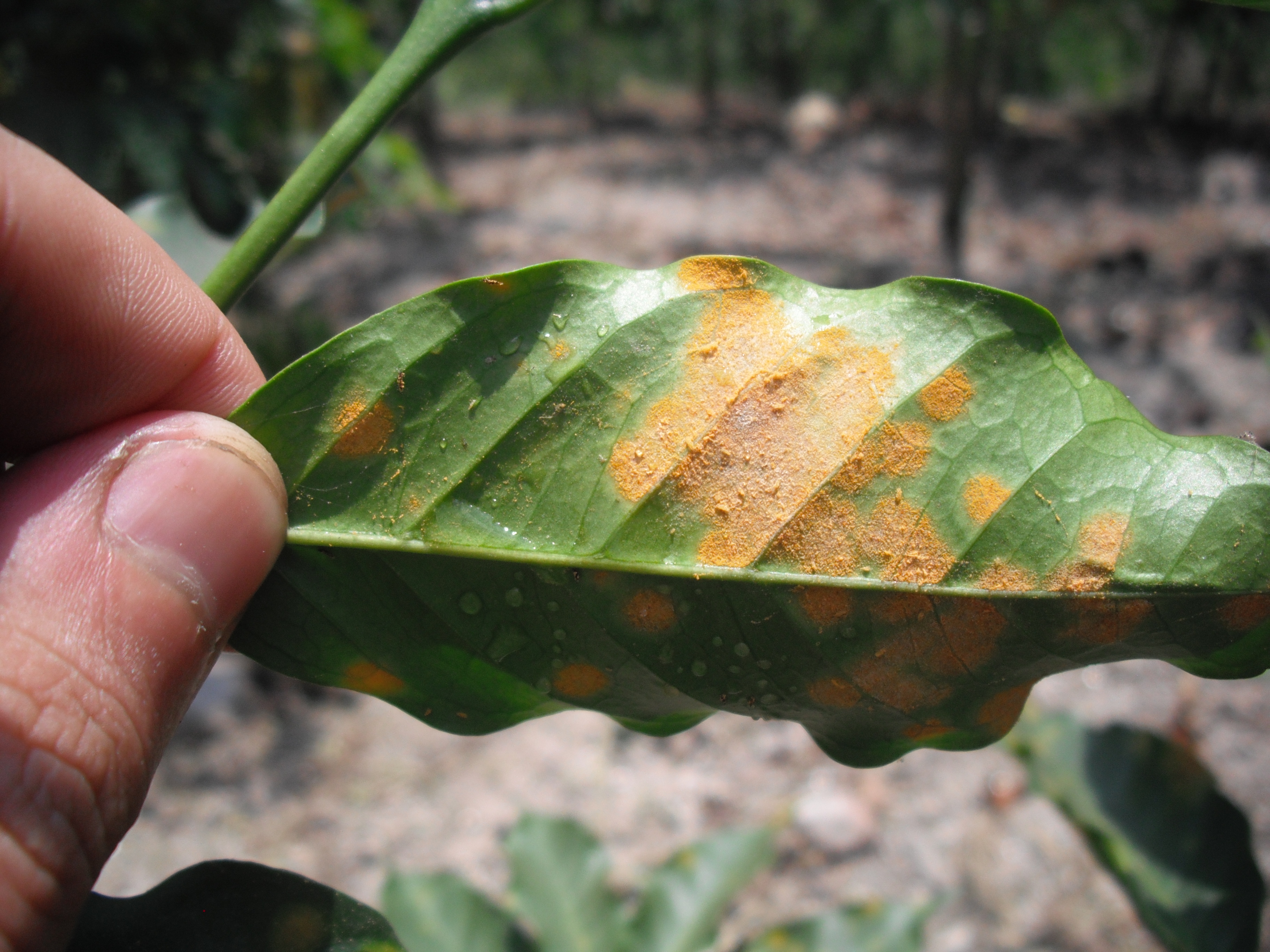
Severe symptoms of leaf rust

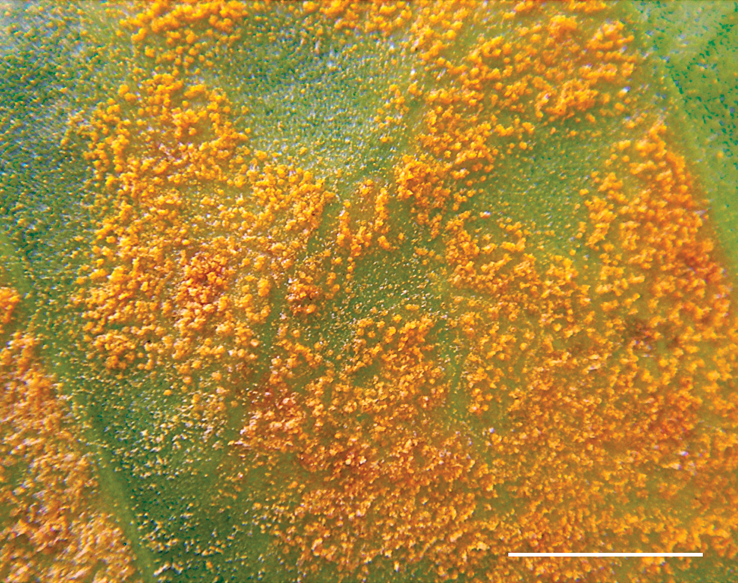
Detail of suprastomatal uredinial pustules coalescing over lower leaf surface (bar = 0.5 cm)

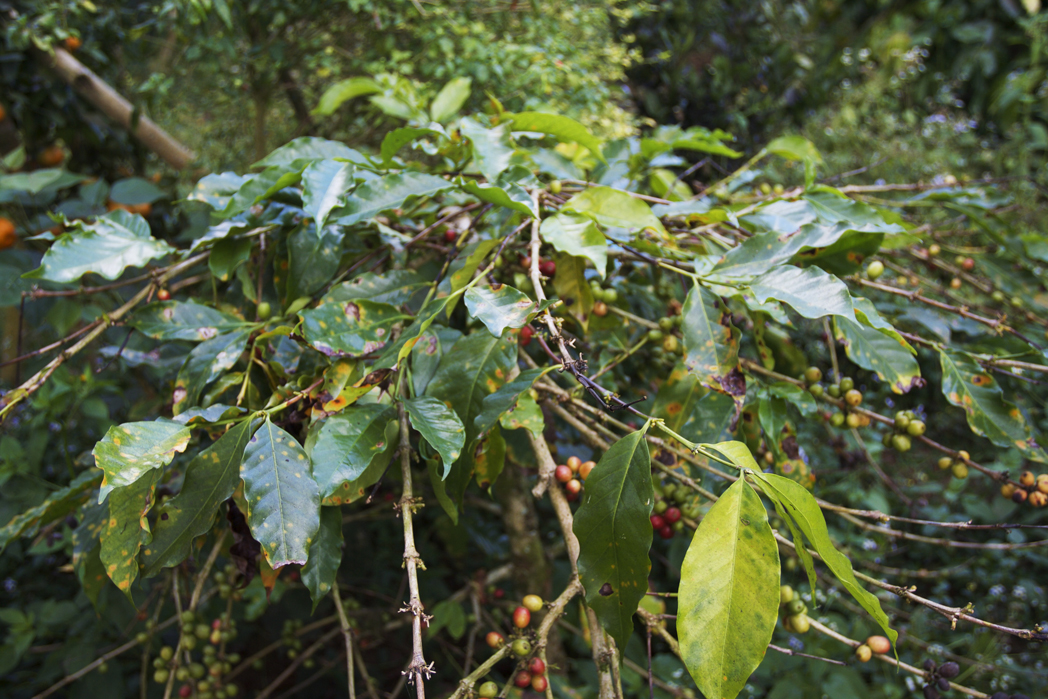
Significant rust infection, rust-induced defoliation, and nutrient deficiencies as a result of damaged leaves

Hemileia vastatrix is a multicellular basidiomycete fungus of the order Pucciniales (previously also known as Uredinales) that causes coffee leaf rust (CLR), a disease affecting the coffee plant. Coffee serves as the obligate host of coffee rust, that is, the rust must have access to and come into physical contact with coffee (Coffea sp.) in order to survive.

CLR is one of the most economically important diseases of coffee, worldwide. Previous epidemics have destroyed coffee production of entire countries. In more recent history, an epidemic in Central America in 2012 reduced the region's coffee output by 16%.

The primary pathological mechanism of the fungus is a reduction in the plant's ability to derive energy through photosynthesis by covering the leaves with fungus spores and/or causing leaves to drop from the plant. The reduction in photosynthetic ability (plant's metabolism) results in a reduction in quantity and quality of flower and fruit production, which ultimately reduces the beverage quality.

== Appearance ==
The mycelium with uredinia looks yellow-orange and powdery, and appears on the underside of leaves as points ~0.1 mm in diameter. Young lesions appear as chlorotic or pale yellow spots some millimetres in diameter, the older being a few centimetres in diameter. Hyphae are club-shaped with tips bearing numerous pedicels on which clusters of urediniospores are produced.

Telia are pale yellowish teliospores often produced in uredinia; teliospores more or less spherical to limoniform, 26–40 × 20–30 μm in diameter, wall hyaline to yellowish, smooth, 1 μm thick, thicker at the apex, pedicel hyaline.

Urediniospores are more or less reniform, 26–40 × 18-28 μm, with hyaline to pale yellowish wall, 1–2 μm thick, strongly warted on the convex side, smooth on the straight or concave side, warts frequently longer (3–7 μm) on spore edges.

There have been no known reports of a host capable of supporting an aecial stage of the fungus.

== Life cycle ==
Hemileia's life cycle begins with the germination of uredospores through germ pores in the spore. It mainly attacks the leaves and is only rarely found on young stems and fruit. Appressoria are produced, which in turn produce vesicles, from which entry into the substomatal cavity is gained. Within 24–48 hours, infection is completed. After successful infection, the leaf blade is colonized and sporulation will occur through the stomata. One lesion produces 4–6 spore crops over a 3–5 month period releasing 300–400,000 spores.

There is currently no known alternate host nor reported cases of infection by basidiospores of H. vastatrix, yet the fungus is able to overcome resistance by plants and scientists do not know exactly how. The predominant hypothesis is that H. vastatrix is heteroecious, completing its life cycle on an alternate host plant which has not yet been found. An alternative hypothesis is that H. vastatrix actually represents an early-diverging autoecious rust, in which the teliospores are non-functional and vestigial, and the sexual life cycle is completed by the urediniospores. Hidden meiosis and sexual reproduction (cryptosexuality) have been found within the generally asexual urediniospores. This finding may explain why new physiological races have arisen so often and so quickly in H. vastatrix.

== Control ==
Recent studies and research papers have shown that CLR is under-researched compared to pathogens of other cash crops and that there are many factors that can influence the incidence and severity of the disease. Therefore, an integrated approach that includes genetic, chemical, and cultural controls is the best course of action.

=== Resistant cultivars ===
According to Talhinhas and colleagues in their 2017 article, "The coffee leaf rust pathogen Hemileia vastatrix: one and a half centuries around the tropics," the most effective and durable strategy against CLR is the use of resistant cultivars. This has a number of benefits beyond disease control and can include the reduction in use of agrochemicals as control. A reduction in chemical application also has positive economic effects for farmers by reducing the cost of production. However, in lieu of deploying new, resistant plant stock, or in the interim between initiation of a renewal program and complete renewal, other methods of control are available.

Professional research and breeding programs such as CIRAD are developing F1 hybrid coffee trees such as Starmaya that have broad genetic resistance to CLR as well as good yield and cup quality, with research showing that F1 hybrids have higher yields and cup quality than conventional Coffea arabica cultivars. Research is also being done on how to democratize the use of F1 hybrids by smallholder coffee farmers who too often can not afford to utilize F1 hybrids. For example, Starmaya is the first F1 hybrid coffee tree that can be propagated in a seed garden rather than the more complicated and expensive process of somatic embryogenesis.

=== Chemicals ===
There are social, environmental, and economic concerns associated with any chemical control of plant diseases and some of these have a more direct and immediate impact than others on a farmer's decision to use chemicals. The use of chemicals must first and foremost make economic sense, and the cost of their use can be as much as 50% of the total cost of production. For smallholder farmers, this can be cost-prohibitive. Copper-based fungicides, such as Bordeaux mixture, have proven to be effective and economical, and work best when applied at inoculum levels below 10%.

Typically copper-based mixtures are used as preventative measures and systemic fungicides are used as curative measures.

By reducing disease incidence, chemical control can help mitigate the reduction in fruit quality and quantity that is caused by the disease.

=== Cultural ===
The extended presence of water on the leaves allows H vastatrix to infect the plant more easily and therefore cultural methods can be directed at reducing the time and the amount of water that remains on leaves. Cultural methods such as pruning branches to allow more air circulation and light penetration can help dry the moisture on the leaves. Increasing spacing between rows and preventing weed growth also allows for more air circulation and light penetration.

==== Plant nutrition ====
The correct amount of plant nutrients can also play a role in host resistance. Adequate nutrition allows the plant's natural, biochemical defenses to perform at optimal levels. For example, nitrogen and potassium are two critical, macronutrients that assist a coffee tree to resist infection. Nitrogen is a critical component of chlorophyll, which is central to photosynthesis. Potassium helps to increase the thickness of a leaf's epidermis, which acts as a barrier to pathogen attack. It also aids in recovery of tissues after an attack by H. vastatrix.

==== Pruning ====
Experiments have shown that removal of infected leaves can possibly reduce the final amount of the disease by a significant amount.

==== Fruit thinning ====
Fruit thinning combined with chemical application (cyproconazole and epoxiconazole for example) can increase effective control.

==== Shade ====
There is a complex interaction between shade, meteorological effects such as rainfall or dry periods, and aerial dispersal of rust. Researchers have found that shade may suppress spore dispersal under dry conditions but assist spore dispersal during wet conditions. The researchers acknowledge the need for further research on the topic.

== Ecology ==
Hemileia vastatrix is an obligate parasite rust fungus that invades and lives on the plants of genus Coffea. In laboratory studies, Hemileia vastatrix has also been observed to be capable of invading Arabidopsis thaliana, but never develops the haustoria structure that is a key part of its parasitism of its known host plants in the wild.

The rust needs suitable temperatures to develop (between 16 °C and 28 °C). High altitude plantations are generally colder, so inoculum will not develop as easily as in plantations located in warmer regions. The presence of free water is required for infection to be completed. Loss of moisture after germination starts inhibits the whole infection process.

Sporulation is most influenced by temperature, humidity, and host resistance. The colonization process is not dependent on leaf wetness but is influenced greatly by temperature and by plant resistance. The main effect of temperature is to determine the length of time for the colonization process (incubation period).

Hemileia vastatrix has two fungal parasites, Verticillium haemiliae and Verticillium psalliotae.

The fungus is of East African origin, but is currently endemic to all producing regions. Coffee originates in high altitude regions of Ethiopia, Sudan, and Kenya, and the rust pathogen is believed to have originated in the same mountains. The earliest reports of the disease hail from the 1860s. It was reported first by a British explorer from regions of Kenya around Lake Victoria in 1861, from where it is believed to have spread to Asia and the Americas.

Rust was first reported in the major coffee growing regions of Sri Lanka (then called Ceylon) in 1867. The causal fungus was first fully described by the English mycologist Michael Joseph Berkeley and his collaborator Christopher Edmund Broome after an analysis of specimens of a "coffee leaf disease" collected by George H.K. Thwaites in Ceylon. Berkeley and Broome named the fungus Hemileia vastatrix, "Hemileia" referring to the half smooth characteristic of the spores and "vastatrix" for the devastating nature of the disease.

It is unknown exactly how the rust reached Ceylon from Ethiopia. Over the years that followed, the disease was recorded in India in 1870, Sumatra in 1876, Java in 1878, and the Philippines in 1889. During 1913 it crossed the African continent from Kenya to the Congo, where it was found in 1918, before spreading to West Africa, the Ivory Coast (1954), Liberia (1955), Nigeria (1962–63) and Angola (1966).

Uredospores are disseminated across long distances mainly by wind and can end up thousands of miles from where they were produced. Over short distances, uredospores are disseminated by both wind and rain splash. Other agents, such as animals, mainly insects and contaminated equipment, occasionally have been shown to be involved with dissemination.

== Pathogenesis ==
Hemileia vastatrix affects the plant by covering part of the leaf surface area or inducing defoliation, both resulting in a reduction in the rate of photosynthesis. Because berry yield is generally linked to the amount of foliage, a reduction in photosynthesis and more importantly, defoliation can affect yield. Continuous colonization of the pathogen depletes the plants resources for surviving until the plant no longer has enough energy to grow or survive.

Coffee plants bred for resistance succeed because of cytological and biochemical resistance mechanisms. Such mechanisms involve transmitting signals to the infection site to stop cell function. The plants' cell degradation response frequently occurs after the formation of the first haustorium and results in rapid hypersensitive cell death. Because Hemileia vastatrix is an obligate parasite, it can no longer survive when surrounded by dead cells. This can be recognized by the presence of browning cells in local regions on a leaf.

== Environment ==
Temperature and moisture specifically play the largest role in infection rate of the coffee plant. Humidity is not enough to allow infection to occur. There must be a presence of water on the leaf for the urediospores to infect, although dry urediospores can survive up to six weeks without water. Dispersal happens primarily by wind, rain, or a combination of both. Transmission over large distances is likely the result of human intervention by spores clinging to clothes, tools, or equipment. Dispersal by insects is unlikely and therefore insignificant. Spore germination only happens when the temperature is 13–31 °C (55–88 °F), and peaks at 21 °C (70 °F); furthermore. Appressorium formation is highest at 11 °C (52 °F) and has a linear decline in production until 32 °C (90 °F), when there is little to no production. Although temperature and moisture are key factors for infection, dispersal, and colonization, plant resistance is also important in determining whether Hemileia vastatrix will survive.

== History ==
The disease coffee leaf rust (CLR) was first described and named by Berkley and Broom in the November 1869 edition of the Gardeners Chronicle. They used specimens sent from Sri Lanka, where the disease was already causing enormous damage to productivity. Many coffee estates in Sri Lanka were forced to collapse or convert their crops to alternatives not affected by CLR, such as tea. The planters nicknamed the disease "Devastating Emily" and it affected Asian coffee production for over twenty years. By 1890, the coffee industry in Sri Lanka was nearly destroyed, although coffee estates still exist in some areas. Historians suggest that the devastated coffee production in Sri Lanka is one of the reasons why Britons have come to prefer tea, as Sri Lanka switched to tea production as a consequence of the disease.

By the 1920s CLR was widely found across much of Africa and Asia, as well as Indonesia and Fiji. It reached Brazil in 1970 and from there it rapidly spread at a rate enabling it to infect all coffee areas in the country by 1975. From Brazil, the disease spread to most coffee-growing areas in Central and South America by 1981, hitting Costa Rica and Colombia in 1983.

As of 1990, coffee rust has become endemic in all major coffee-producing countries.

=== 2012 coffee leaf rust epidemic ===
In 2012, there was a major increase in coffee rust across ten Latin American and Caribbean countries. The disease became an epidemic and the resulting crop losses led to a fall in supply, outstripping demand. Coffee prices rose as a result, although other factors such as growing demand for gourmet beans in China, Brazil, and India also contributed.

USAID estimates that between 2012 and 2014, CLR caused $1 billion in damage and affected over 2 million people in Latin America.

The reasons for the epidemic remain unclear but an emergency rust summit meeting in Guatemala in April 2013 compiled a long list of shortcomings. These included a lack of resources to control the rust, the dismissal of early warning signs, ineffective fungicide application techniques, lack of training, poor infrastructure and conflicting advice. In a keynote talk at the "Let's Talk Roya" meeting (El Salvador, November 4, 2013), Dr Peter Baker, a senior scientist at CAB International, raised several key points regarding the epidemic including the proportional lack of investment in research and development in such a high value industry and the lack of investment in new varieties in key coffee producing countries such as Colombia.

Typical coffee cultivars maintained by farmers before the epidemic included Caturra, Bourbon, Mundo Novo, and Typica, all of which are susceptible to H. vastatrix. Also before the epidemic of 2012, 82% of farms were certified organic, which limits the agrochemicals farmers can use. However, there are a number of fungicides that can be used in certified organic systems, such as copper-based Bordeaux mix as well as commercial mixtures.

==== Honduras ====
During this period, Honduras experienced a significant epidemic of CLR. 80,000 hectares of coffee farms were infected and The Honduran National Institute of Coffee (IHCAFE) estimates that 30,000 farmers lost over half of their coffee production capacity and a third of those—10,000 farmers—suffered a complete loss of coffee production capacity. Roughly 84% of coffee producers in Honduras are smallholders and are therefore more vulnerable to loss of production than estate farmers.

==== Further ====
Coffee crops in Guatemala have been ruined by coffee rust, and a state of emergency has been declared in February 2013.

CLR has been a problem in Mexico.

CLR disease is a big problem in coffee plantations in Peru, declared in sanitary emergency by government (Decreto Supremo N° 082-2013-PCM).

In late October 2020, USDA ARS detected rust on Maui. Immediately the Hawaii Department of Agriculture began inspections around the state, not just on Maui itself. They initially found plants they suspect to also be infected in Hilo on the big island, however these plants tested negative to CLR, though it was detected on plants in the Kailua-Kona region of the island. In January, 2021, additional infections have been found on the islands of Oahu and Lanai, and plant quarantines have gone into effect as of March 2021 for interisland transport of coffee plants or parts between the four islands that CLR has been found on.

== Economic impact ==
Coffee leaf rust (CLR) has direct and indirect economic impacts on coffee production. Direct impacts include decreased quantity and quality of yield produced by the diseased plant and the cost of inputs meant specifically to control the disease. Indirect impacts include increased costs to combat and control the disease. Methods of combating and controlling the disease include fungicide application and stumping diseased plants and replacing them with resistant breeds. Both methods include significant labor and material costs and in the case of stumping, include a years-long decline in production (coffee seedlings are not fully productive for three to five years after planting).

Due to the complexity of accurately accounting for losses attributed to CLR, there are few records quantifying yield losses. Estimates of yield loss vary by country and can range anywhere between 15 and 80%. Worldwide loss is estimated at 15%.

Some early data from Ceylon documenting the losses in the late 19th century indicate coffee production was reduced by 75%. As farmers shifted from coffee to other crops not affected by CLR, land used for growing coffee was reduced by 80%, from 68,787 to 14,170 ha.

In addition to the costs mentioned above, additional costs include research and development costs in producing resistant cultivars. These costs are normally borne by the industry, local and national governments and international aid agencies.

Colombia's National Federation of Coffee Growers (Fedecafe) set up a research lab specifically designed to find ways to stop the disease, as the country is a leading exporter of the Coffea arabica bean that is particularly prone to the disease.
