= Ceraceopsora =

Scientific classification
- Kingdom: Fungi
- Division: Basidiomycota
- Class: Pucciniomycetes
- Order: Pucciniales
- Family: Chaconiaceae
- Genus: Ceraceopsora; Kakish., T.Sato & S.Sato (1984)

Type species
- Ceraceopsora elaeagni Kakish., T.Sato & S.Sato (1984)

Genus of fungi

Ceraceopsora is a genus of rust fungi in the Chaconiaceae family. The genus is monotypic, containing the single species Ceraceopsora elaeagni, found in Japan growing on Anemone flaccida and Elaeagnus umbellata.
