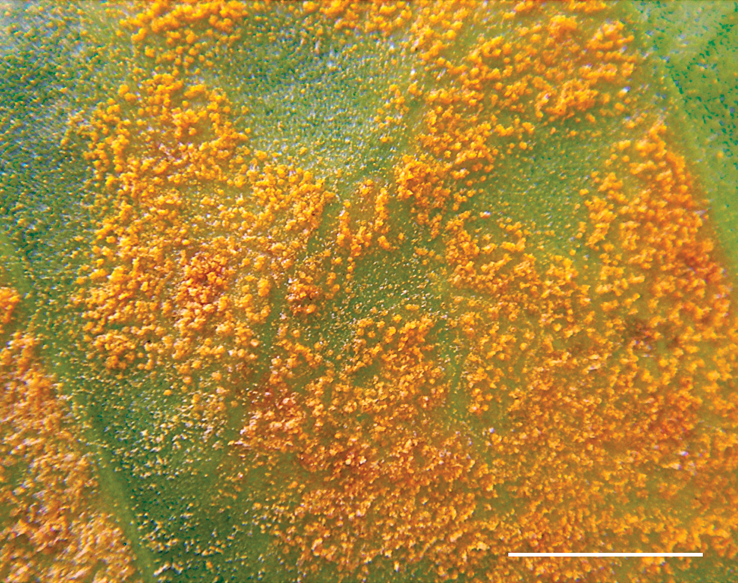
- Hemileia vastatrix uredinial pustules (bar = 5 mm)

Scientific classification
- Domain: Eukaryota
- Kingdom: Fungi
- Division: Basidiomycota
- Class: Pucciniomycetes
- Order: Pucciniales
- Family: Zaghouaniaceae
- Genus: Hemileia; Berk. & Broome

= Hemileia =

Genus of fungi

Hemileia is a genus of rust fungi, now placed in the family Zaghouaniaceae, but long considered incertae sedis in the order Pucciniales. This genus has a pan-tropical distribution and includes important crop plant pathogens, such as the causative organism of coffee leaf rust.

== Species ==
Species Fungorum and the Global Biodiversity Information Facility lists:

1. Hemileia africana (Lagerh.) Judith & Rossman
2. Hemileia alafiae (Cummins & Gopalkr.) Judith & Rossman
3. Hemileia antidesmatis P.Syd. & Syd.
4. Hemileia aureospora J.M.Yen
5. Hemileia buntingii Wakef. & Hansf.
6. Hemileia canthii Berk. & Broome
7. Hemileia chlorocodonis Syd. & P.Syd.
8. Hemileia coffeicola Maubl. & Roger
9. Hemileia cryptostegiae Vienn.-Bourg.
10. Hemileia deightonii Syd.
11. Hemileia detergibile (Thüm.) Ritschel
12. Hemileia dioscoreae-aculeatae (Racib.) P.Syd. & Syd.
13. Hemileia evansii Syd. & P.Syd.
14. Hemileia fadogiae Syd. & P.Syd.
15. Hemileia gardeniae-floridae Sawada
16. Hemileia gardeniae-thunbergiae (Henn.) Maubl. & Roger
17. Hemileia hansfordii Syd.
18. Hemileia harunganae Cummins
19. Hemileia helvola Syd. & P.Syd.
20. Hemileia holarrhenae Syd. & P.Syd.
21. Hemileia holstii (Henn.) P.Syd. & Syd.
22. Hemileia indica Massee
23. Hemileia jasmini C.S.Krishnam. & Rangaswami
24. Hemileia kilimanjarensis (Ritschel) Judith & Rossman
25. Hemileia kumasensis (Cummins) Judith & Rossman
26. Hemileia laurentii (Henn.) P.Syd. & Syd.
27. Hemileia mandevillae Cummins
28. Hemileia mbelensis (Henn.) P.Syd. & Syd.
29. Hemileia meiogynes C.Mohanan
30. Hemileia mildbraedii (Syd. & P.Syd.) P.Syd. & Syd.
31. Hemileia mussaendae Vienn.-Bourg.
32. Hemileia mysorensis Thirum. & Gopalakrishn.
33. Hemileia oxyanthi Cummins
34. Hemileia pavetticola Maubl. & Roger
35. Hemileia phaii (Racib.) P.Syd. & Syd.
36. Hemileia randiicola Thaung
37. Hemileia rauvolfiae J.M.Yen & Gilles
38. Hemileia rhois E.Castell.
39. Hemileia ruspoliae Cummins
40. Hemileia rutideae Cummins
41. Hemileia scheffleri (Syd. & P.Syd.) P.Syd. & Syd.
42. Hemileia scholzii (Henn.) Syd. & P.Syd.
43. Hemileia scitula Syd.
44. Hemileia secamones Wakef. & Hansf.
45. Hemileia smallii Wakef. & Hansf.
46. Hemileia solaninum (Henn.) Judith & Rossman
47. Hemileia sonsensis (Henn.) P.Syd. & Syd.
48. Hemileia strophanthi (Racib.) Racib.
49. Hemileia thomasii Thirum. & Naras.
50. Hemileia vastatrix Berk. & Broome - type species
51. Hemileia wrightiae (Racib.) Racib.
52. Hemileia xanthophylli C.Mohanan
