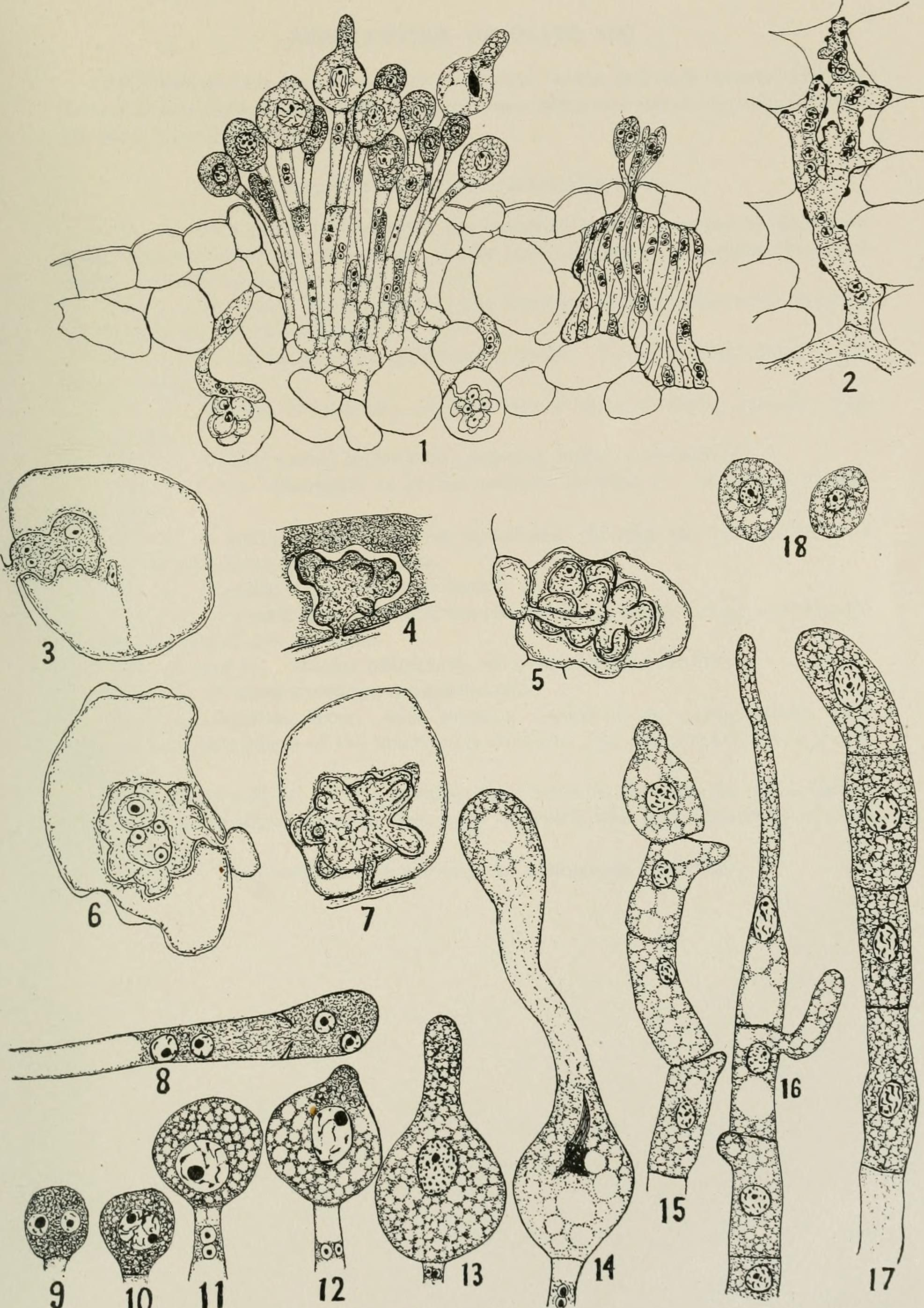
- Cytological structures of Botryorhiza hippocrateae

Scientific classification
- Kingdom: Fungi
- Division: Basidiomycota
- Class: Pucciniomycetes
- Order: Pucciniales
- Family: Chaconiaceae; Cummins & Y.Hirats. (1983)

Type genus
- Chaconia Juel (1897)

= Chaconiaceae =

Family of fungi

The Chaconiaceae are a family of rust fungi in the order Pucciniales. The family contained 8 genera and 75 species in 2008. By 2020, there were 8 genera and 84 species.

Most species have a tropical distribution. Maravalia cryptostegiae has been used with success as a biocontrol agent against rubber vine in Australia.

== Genera ==
As accepted by Wijayawardene et al. 2020;

1. Ceraceopsora Kakish., T. Sato & S. Sato (1)
2. Chaconia Juel (12)
3. Goplana Racib. (13)
4. Maravalia Arthur (41)
5. Olivea Arthur (8)
6. Telomapea G.F. Laundon (1)

Note: the genera Achrotelium Syd. and Botryorhiza Whetzel & Olive are now placed in the Zaghouaniaceae.
