= Edwin Butterworth Mains =

American mycologist (1890-1968)

- Born: 31 March 1890; Coldwater, Michigan, US
- Died: 23 December 1968 (aged 78); Ann Arbor, Michigan, US
- Education: University of Michigan
- Known for: Taxonomy of rust fungi, taxonomy of Cordyceps, taxonomy of Geoglossaceae
- Scientific career
- Fields: Mycology
- Workplaces: Purdue University (1916–1930), University of Michigan (1930–1960)
- Author abbrev. (botany): Mains

Edwin Butterworth Mains (1890–1968) was an American mycologist. He was known for his taxonomic research on the rust fungi (Pucciniomycetes), the genus Cordyceps, and the earth tongues (Geoglossaceae).

== Biography ==
Edwin Butterworth Mains was born on 31 March 1890 in Coldwater, Branch County, Michigan. The son of Benjamin W. and Mary Ann (Butterworth) Mains. Mains began his undergraduate education at Michigan State University in 1909, but transferred to the University of Michigan in 1911. He earned his Ph.D. in botany from the University of Michigan in 1916 under the tutelage of Calvin Henry Kauffman while investigating the parasite-host relationships of various rust fungi. He was appointed Assistant Botanist at the Purdue University Agricultural Experimental Station by Joseph Charles Arthur in 1916. He married Mary Esther Elder on 16 August 1917 in East Lansing, Michigan. Mains was appointed acting director of the University of Michigan Herbarium following the illness of C.H. Kauffman in 1930 and was named director in 1931. Mains remained at the University of Michigan, both as a professor and as director of the Herbarium, until his retirement in 1960. Mains served as chair of the Department of Botany at Michigan during World War II. Mains remained in Ann Arbor following his retirement and died of a heart attack on 23 December 1968.

While at Michigan, Mains was active in the Ann Arbor Garden Club. Mains was highly interested in photography and was a noted and exhibited photographer of nature. Mains was prominent in the development and use of color photography in mycological education.

== Mycological contributions ==
Mains' early professional career was dedicated to the study of plant rusts (Pucciniales). He collaborated with Arthur and others on "The Plant Rusts (Uredinales)" in 1929, a major treatment of an economically important group of fungi. Mains continued working on rusts after transferring to Michigan, though most of his later studies focused on Cordyceps and the Geoglossaceae. Mains' collections and research greatly enriched the University of Michigan Herbarium, which developed "from a position of obscurity to one of international prominence" under his directorship.

Mains was elected vice-president of the Mycological Society of America in 1938, and president in 1942. Mains also served the Mycological Society of America as a counselor from 1943-1944. Mains and C.L. Lundell investigated the flora of the high rain forest and mountain pine ridge in the southern El Cayo District, British Honduras in 1937.

== Taxa described ==
Mains described a total of 80 new species, two new form, eleven new varieties, and made 20 new combinations of species. As of 2014, 55 of his species, both new forms, two varieties, and 18 recombinations are still accepted (having not been assigned to another genus or reduced to synonymy under previously published names). Mains also described five genera, three of which were later reduced to synonymy.

== Mycological lineage ==
Mains belongs to the C.H. Kauffman Lineage of American mycologists. Kauffman himself was influenced by Robert Almer Harper and George Francis Atkinson. During Mains' tenure at the University of Michigan, he mentored or advised thirteen prominent mycologists:

- Jean D. Arnold (Ph.D. 1935)
- Harold Johnston Brodie (Ph.D. 1934)
- Clair Alan Brown (Ph.D. 1933)
- George William Fisher (Ph.D. 1935)
- John Robert Hardison (MS 1940, Ph.D. 1942)
- Henry Andrew Imshaug (Ph.D. 1951)
- Marion Lee Lohman
- Josiah Linocoln Lowe (Ph.D. 1938)
- Douglas Barton Osborne Savile (Ph.D. 1939)
- John Arvid Schmitt (MS 1950, Ph.D. 1954)
- Alexander Hanchett Smith (Ph.D. 1933)
- Delbert Swartz
- Joseph S. Tidd

Mains' lineage of North American mycologists is large and widespread. Brodie, Fisher, Imshaug, Lowe, and Smith all mentored a number of students, including Joseph Ammirati, Howard E. Bigelow, Irwin M. Brodo, Robert Lee Gilbertson, Orson K. Miller Jr., and Harry Thiers, all of whom have been greatly influential in American mycology.

== Eponymous taxa ==
- Mainsia H.S. Jacks 1931 = Gerwasia Racib. 1909
- Ravenelia mainsiana Arthur & Holw. 1918
- Favolaschia mainsii Singer 1974
- Galerina mainsii A.H. Sm. & Singer 1958
- Gibellula mainsii Samson & H.C. Evans 1992

== Publications ==
Mains authored or coauthored more than 90 research publications and books:

- 1916. Mains EB. "Some factors concerned in the germination of rust spores". Report of the Michigan Academy of Science 17: 136-140.
- 1916. ———. "The wintering of Coleosporum solidaginis". Phytopathology 6: 371-372.
- 1917. ———. "The relationship of some rusts to the physiology of their hosts". American Journal of Botany 4 (4): 179-220.
- 1917. ———. "Species of Melampsora occurring on Euphorbia in North America". Phytopathology 7 101-105.
- 1919. Arthur JC, Mains EB. "Grass rusts of unusual structure". Bulletin of the Torrey Botanical Club 46 (10): 411-415.
- 1921. Mains EB. "Unusual rusts on Nyssa and Urticastrum". American Journal of Botany 8 (9): 442-451.
- 1921. ———. "The heteroecism of Puccinia montanensis, P. koeleriae, and P. apocrypta". Mycologia 13 (6): 315-322.
- 1921. ———, Jackson HS. "Two strains of Puccinia triticina on wheat in the United States". Phytopathology 11: 40.
- 1921. Jackson HS, Mains EB. "Aecial stage of the orange leaf rust of wheat, Puccinia triticina Eriks." Journal of Agricultural Research (Washington, DC) 22: 151-172.
- 1922. Arthur JC, Mains EB. "Uredinales: Bullaria". North American Flora 7: 482-515.
- 1923. Mains EB, Jackson HS. "Strains of the leaf rust of wheat, Puccinia triticina, in the United States". Phytopathology 13: 36.
- 1923. Mains EB, Leighty CE. "Resistance in rye to leaf rust, Puccinia dispersa Erikss." Journal of Agricultural Research 25 (5): 243-252.
- 1924. Mains EB. "Notes on greenhouse culture methods used in rust investigations". Proceedings of the Indiana Academy of Sciences 33: 241-257.
- 1924. Mains EB, Jackson HS. "Aecial stage of the leaf rust of rye, Puccinia dispersa Erikss. and Hen., and of barley, P. anomala Rostr., in the United States". Journal of Agricultural Research 28 (11): 1119-1126.
- 1925. Whetzel HH, Jackson HS, Mains EB. "The composite life history of Puccinia podophyli Schw." Journal of Agricultural Research 30: 65-79.
- 1926. Mains EB. "Rye resistant to leaf rust, stem rust, and powdery mildew". Journal of Agricultural Research 32: 201-221.
- 1926. ———. "Studies in rust resistance". Journal of Heredity 17 (9): 313-325.
- 1926. ———, Jackson HS. "Physiologic specialisation in the leaf rust of Wheat, Puccinia triticina Erikas." Phytopathology 16 (2): 89-120.
- 1926. Mains EB, Leighty CE, Johnston CO. "Inheritance of resistance to leaf rust, Puccinia tritica Erikss., in crosses of common wheat, Triticum vulgare Vill." Journal of Agricultural Research 32: 931-972.
- 1927 (Published in 1928). Mains EB. "Observations concerning clover diseases". Proclamations of the Indiana Academy of Sciences 37: 355-364.
- 1928. Mains EB, Thompson D. "Studies on snapdragon rust, Puccinia antirrhini". Phytopathology 18: 150.
- 1928 (Published in 1929). ———. "Observations concerning disease of iris and tulips". Proceedings of the Indiana Academy of Sciences 38: 93-102.
- 1929. ———. "Physiologic specialization and species development and nomenclature". Proclamations of the Internal Congress of Plant Sciences, Ithaca, New York 1926 2: 1767-1770.
- 1929. Arthur JC, Kern FD, Orton CR, Fromme FD, Jackson HS, Mains EB, Bisby GR. The plant rusts (Uridinales). John Wiley and Sons, London. 446 pp.
- 1929. Gardner MW, Mains EB. "Indiana plant diseases". Proceedings of the Indiana Academy of Sciences 39: 85-99.
- 1930. Mains EB. "Host specialization of barley leaf rust Puccinia anamola". Phytopathology 20 (2): 873-882.
- 1930. ———. "Effect of leaf rust (Puccinia triticina Eriks.) on yield of wheat". Journal of Agricultural Research 40 (5): 417-446.
- 1930. ———, Diktz SM. "Physiologic forms of Barley mildew, Erysiphe graminis hordei". Phytopathology 20 (3): 229-239.
- 1931. Mains EB. "Calvin Henry Kauffman". Science 74 (1914): 235.
- 1931. ———. "Inheritance of resistance to rust, Puccinia sorghi, in maize." Journal of Agricultural Research 43: 419-430.
- 1932. ———. "Physiologic specialization in Puccinia eatoniae". Mycologia 24 (2): 207-214.
- 1932. ———. "Calvin Henry Kauffman". Mycologia 24 (3): 265-267.
- 1932. ———. "Host specialization in the leaf rust of grasses, Puccinia rubigo-vera". Papers from the Michigan Academy of Science, Arts, and Letter 17: 289-394.
- 1933. ———. "Studies concerning heteroecious rusts". Mycologia 25 (5): 407-417.
- 1933. ———. "Host specialization in Erysiphe graminis tritici". Proceedings of the National Academy of Sciences of the United States of America 19 (1): 49-53.
- 1934. ———. "Angiospora, a new genus of rusts on grasses". Mycologia 26 (2): 122-132.
- 1934. ———. "The genera Cordyceps and Ophiocordyceps in Michigan". Proceedings of the American Philosophical Society 74 (4): 263-271.
- 1934. ———. "Host specialization in the rust of iris, Puccinia iridis". American Journal of Botany 21 (1): 23-33.
- 1934. ———. "Host specialization of Puccinia sorghi". Phytopathology 24 (4): 405-411.
- 1934. ———. "Inheritance of resistance to powdery mildew, Erysiphe graminis tritici, in wheat". Phytopathology 24 (11): 1257-1261.
- 1935. ———. "Spumula, a new genus of rusts". Mycologia 27: 638-641.
- 1935. ———. "Rust resistance in Antirrhinum". Phytopathology 25 (11): 977-991.
- 1935. ———. "Michigan fungi. I". Papers from the Michigan Academy of Science, Arts and Letters 20: 81-93.
- 1935. ———. "Rusts and smuts from the Yucutan Peninsula". Publications, Carnegie Institute of Washington 461: 95-106.
- 1936 (Published in 1937). ———. "Rusts from the lower Rio Grande valley, Texas". Papers from the Michigan Academy of Science, Arts and Letters 22: 153-157.
- 1937. ———. "A new species of Cordyceps with notes concerning other species". Mycologia 29 (6): 674-677.
- 1937 (Published in 1938). ———. "Host specialization in Coleosporium solidaginis and C. campanulae". Papers from the Michigan Academy of Science, Arts and Letters 23: 171-175.
- 1938. ———. "The genus Blastospora". American Journal of Botany 25 (9): 677-679.
- 1938. ———. "Studies in the Uredinales, the genus Chaconia". Bulletin of the Torrey Botanical Club 65 (9): 625-629.
- 1938. ———. "Additional studies concerning the rust of iris, Puccinia iridis". Phytopathology 28 (1): 67-71.
- 1938. ———. "Two unusual rusts of grasses". Mycologia 30 (1): 42-45.
- 1938. ———. "Mycological foray". Mycologia 30 (2): 243.
- 1939. ———. "Studies in the Uredinales, the genus Maravalia". Bulletin of the Torrey Botanical Club 66 (3): 173-179.
- 1939. ———. "Scopella gen. nov. of the Pucciniaceae". Annales Mycologici 37 (1): 57-60.
- 1939. ———. "Bitzea, a new genus in the Pucciniaceae". Mycologia 31 (1): 33-42.
- 1939. ———. "The genera Skierka and Cteoderma". Mycologia 31 (2): 175-190.
- 1939. ———. "New and unusual species of the Uredinales". Bulletin of the Torrey Botanical Club 66 (9): 617-621.
- 1939. ———. "Cordyceps from the mountains of North Carolina and Tennessee". Journal of the Elisha Mitchell Scientific Society 55 (1): 117-129.
- 1939. ———. "Mycological Society of America: Report on the 1938 foray". Mycologia 31 (2): 232-234.
- 1939. ———. "Rusts from British Honduras". Contributions from the University of Michigan Herbarium 1: 5-19.
- 1939. ———, Overholts LO, Pomerleau R. "Fungi collected at the foray, August 1938". Mycologia 31 (6): 728-736.
- 1939 (Published in 1940). Mains EB. "Cordyceps species from Michigan". Papers from the Michigan Academy of Science, Arts and Letters 25: 79-84.
- 1940. ———. "Tegillum, a new genus of the Uredinales". Bulletin of the Torrey Botanical Club 67 (8): 705-709.
- 1940. ———. "Species of Cordyceps". Mycologia 32 (3): 310-320.
- 1940. ———. "New and unusual species of the Geoglossaceae". American Journal of Botany 27 (5): 322-326.
- 1940. ———. "Cordyceps species from British Honduras". Mycologia 32 (1): 16-22.
- 1940. ———. "Species of Cordyceps". Mycologia 32 (3): 310-320.
- 1941. ———. "Cordyceps stylophora Ber. and Br. and C. ravenelii Ber. and Curt." Mycologia 33 (6): 611-617.
- 1942. ———. "Phlox resistant to powdery mildew". Phytopathology 32 (5): 414-418.
- 1942. ———. "Joseph Charles Arthur (1850-1942)". Mycologia 34 (6): 601-605.
- 1947. ———. "New and interesting species of Cordyceps". Mycologia 39 (5): 535-545.
- 1948. ———. "Entomogenous fungi". Mycologia 40 (4): 402-416.
- 1948. ———. "Two unusual fungi from Glacier National Park, Montana". Mycologia 40 (6): 717-723.
- 1949. ———. "Cordyceps bicephala Berk. and C. australis (Speg.) Sacc." Bulletin of the Torrey Botanical Club 76: 24-30.
- 1949. ———. "New species of Torrubiella, Hirsutella and Gibellula". Mycologia 41 (3): 303-310.
- 1950. ———. "The genus Gibellula on spiders in North America". Mycologia 42 (2): 306-321.
- 1950. ———. "Entomogenous species of Akanthomyces, Hymenostilbe and Insecticola in North America". Mycologia 42 (4): 566-589.
- 1951. ———. "Notes concerning entomogenous fungi". Bulletin of the Torrey Botanical Club 78 (2): 122-133.
- 1952. ———. "Entomogenous species of Hirsutella, Tilachlidium and Synnematium". Mycologia 43 (6): 691-718.
- 1953. ———. "Stilbum tomentosum". Papers from the Michigan Academy of Science, Arts and Letters 38: 45-51.
- 1954. ———. "Species of Cordyceps on spiders". Bulletin of the Torrey Botanical Club 81 (6): 492-500.
- 1954. ———. "North American species of Geoglossum and Trichoglossum". Mycologia 46 (5): 586-631.
- 1955. ———. "North American hyaline-spored species of the Geoglossaceae". Mycologia 47 (6): 846-877.
- 1955. ———. "Some entomogenous species of Isaria". Papers from the Michigan Academy of Science, Arts and Letters 40: 23-32.
- 1956. ———. "The relationship of Cudoniella and Helotium". Mycologia 48 (3): 410-419.
- 1956. ———. "North American species of the Geoglossaceae. Tribe Cudonieae". Mycologia 48 (5): 694-710.
- 1957. ———. "Species of Cordyceps parasitic on Elaphomyces". Bulletin of the Torrey Botanical Club 84 (4): 243-251.
- 1957. ———. "Information concerning species of Cordyceps and Ophionectria in the Lloyd Herbarium". Lloydia 20 (4): 219-227.
- 1958. ———. "North American entomogenous species of Cordyceps". Mycologia 50: 169-222.
- 1959. ———. "North American species of Aschersonia parasitic on Aleyrodidae". Journal of Insect Pathology 1: 43-47.
- 1959. ———. "Species of Hypocrella". Mycopathologia et Mycologia Applicata 11: 311-326.
- 1959. ———. "Cordyceps species". Bulletin of the Torrey Botanical Club 86 (1): 46-58.
- 1959. ———. "North American species of Aschersonia parasitic on Aleyrodidae". Journal of Insect Pathology 1 (1): 43-47.
- 1960. ———. "Species of Aschersonia (Sphaeropsidales)". Lloydia 22 (3): 215-221.
