= Chaconia (fungus) =

Scientific classification
- Kingdom: Fungi
- Division: Basidiomycota
- Class: Pucciniomycetes
- Order: Pucciniales
- Family: Chaconiaceae
- Genus: Chaconia; Juel (1897)

Type species
- Chaconia alutacea Juel (1897)

Species
- C. alutacea C. brasiliensis C. butleri C. coaetanea C. ingae C. maprouneae C. thailandica

Synonyms
- Desmotelium Syd. (1937); Bitzea Mains (1939)

Genus of fungi

Chaconia is a genus of rust fungi in the Chaconiaceae family. The widespread genus contains seven species that grow mostly on dicots, especially Leguminosae.
