= Heteroecious =

Several-host parasite

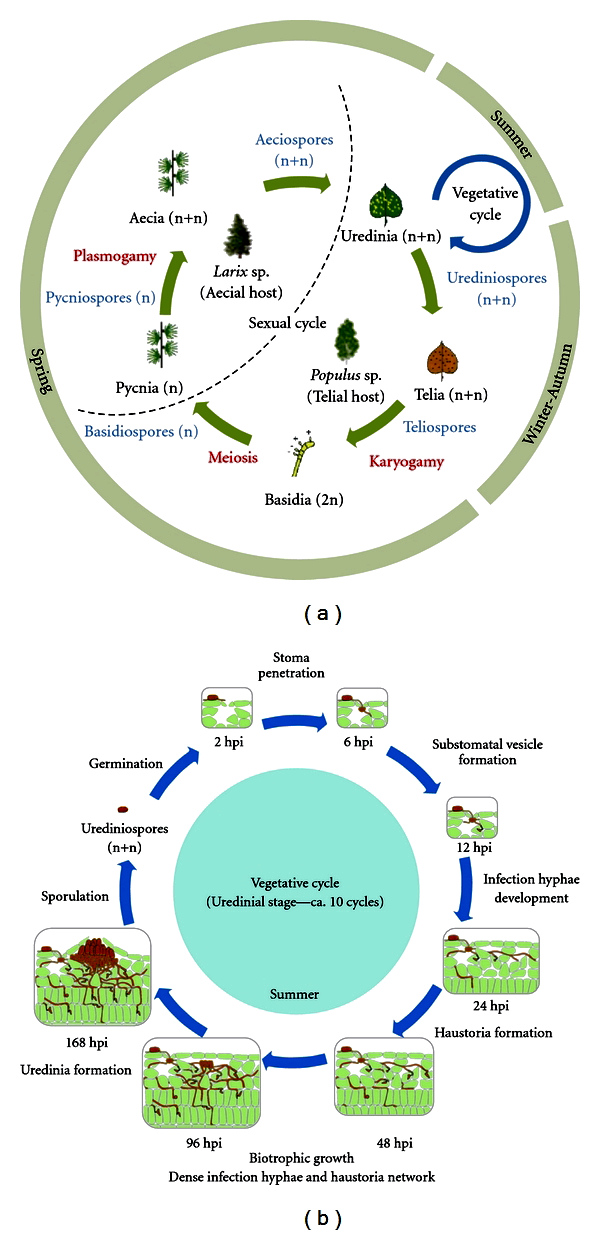
Melampsora laricis-populina life cycle. (a) Biological macrocyclic heteroecious cycle of M. larici-populina. (b) Vegetative cycle occurring on poplar leaves and used as a model for molecular investigations of the poplar-poplar rust interaction. hpi=hours of postinoculation.

A heteroecious parasite is one that requires at least two hosts. The primary host is the host in which the parasite spends its adult life; the other is the secondary host. Both hosts are required for the parasite to complete its life cycle. This can be contrasted with an autoecious parasite which can complete its life cycle on a single host species. Many rust fungi have heteroecious life cycles:

In parasitology, heteroxeny, or heteroxenous development, is a synonymous term that characterizes a parasite whose development involves several hosts.

== Fungal examples ==
- Gymnosporangium (Cedar-apple rust): the juniper is the primary (telial) host and the apple, pear or hawthorn is the secondary (aecial) host.
- Cronartium ribicola (White pine blister rust): the primary host are white pines, and currants the secondary.
- Hemileia vastatrix (Coffee rust): the primary host is coffee plant, and the alternate host is unknown.
- Puccinia graminis (Stem rust): the primary hosts include Kentucky bluegrass, barley, and wheat; barberry is the alternate host.
- Puccinia coronata var. avenae (Crown rust of oats): Oats are the primary host; Rhamnus spp. (Buckthorns) are the alternate hosts.
- Phakopsora meibomiae and P. pachyrhizi (Soybean Rust): the primary host is soybean and various legumes. The alternate host is unknown.
- Puccinia porri (Leek rust): autoecious

== History ==
The phenomenon of heteroecy was first discovered by A.S. Ørsted in 1863.
