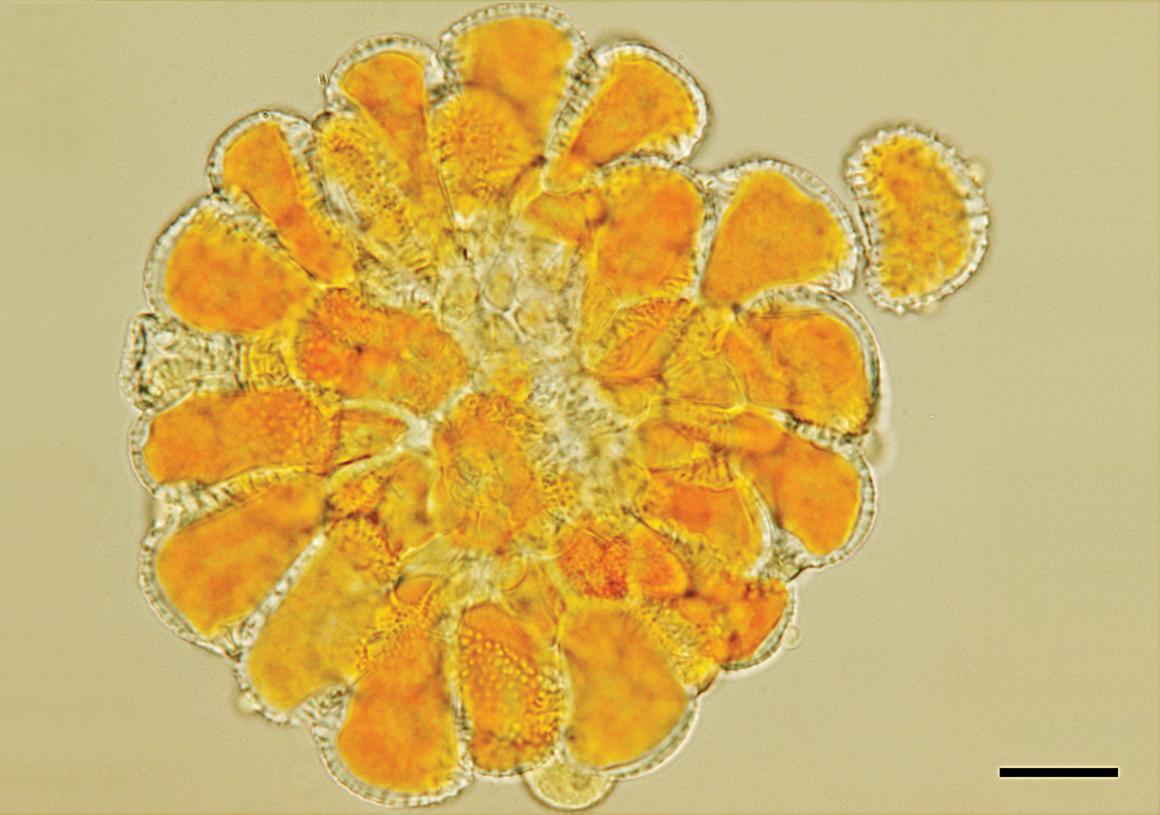
- spores of Hemileia vastatrix (bar = 20 µm)

Scientific classification
- Domain: Eukaryota
- Kingdom: Fungi
- Division: Basidiomycota
- Class: Pucciniomycetes
- Order: Pucciniales
- Family: Zaghouaniaceae; P. Syd. & Syd. emend. Aime & McTaggart

Synonyms
- Hemileieae Dietel; Mikronegeriaceae Cummins & Y. Hirats. (as “Micronegeriaceae”)

= Zaghouaniaceae =

Family of fungi

The Zaghouaniaceae are a family of rust fungus genera, some of which have long been considered incertae sedis in the order Pucciniales, based on the type genus Zaghouania. The classification of fungal taxa based on only morphological characteristics has long been recognised as problematical, so this order was reviewed over a long-term study using three DNA loci (including type species wherever possible) and published in 2021.

== Genera ==
In their 2021 review, Aime and McTaggart included the following genera:

1. Achrotelium Syd. (1928)
2. Blastospora Dietel (1908) (sometimes placed in the Mikronegeriaceae)
3. Botryorhiza Whetzel & Olive (1917)
4. Elateraecium M.J.Thirumalachar, F.D.Kern & B.V.Patil, 1966 (= Hiratsukamyces)
5. Hemileia Berk. & Broome
6. Mikronegeria Dietel (sometimes placed in the Mikronegeriaceae)
7. Zaghouania Pat., 1901 (previously placed in the Pucciniaceae; synonym Cystopsora E.J. Butler)
- Note: this family is also likely to include the genus Desmosorus Ritschel, Oberw. & Berndt.
