= Paul Dietel =

German mycologist (1860–1947)

Paul Dietel (15 February 1860, Greiz – 30 October 1947, Zwickau) was a German mycologist.

He studied mathematics and natural sciences at the universities of Leipzig, Berlin and Göttingen, and afterwards worked as a schoolteacher in Greiz, Leipzig, Reichenbach im Vogtland and Glauchau.

He specialized in research of rust fungi (Uredinales) — from 1887 to 1943 he was the author of 150 scientific papers on rusts. His extensive treatment of rust fungi in Engler and Prantl's Die Natürlichen Pflanzenfamilien was recognized as its definitive account for many years.

In 1897 Paul Christoph Hennings named the genus Dietelia (family Pucciniosiraceae) in his honor.

== Selected writings ==
- Beiträge zur Morphologie und Biologie der Uredineen, 1887 – On the morphology and biology of Uredinales.
- "New Californian Uredineae" (published in English, 1893).
- "Descriptions of new species of Uredineae and Ustilagineae, with remarks on some other species" (published in English, 1893).
- "New North American Uredineae" (published in English, 1895).
