= French Agricultural Research Centre for International Development =

French Agricultural Research Centre for International Development (CIRAD)
- Centre de coopération internationale en recherche agronomique pour le développement

Agency overview
- Employees: 1650
- Website: www.cirad.fr

The French Agricultural Research Centre for International Development (CIRAD; French: Centre de coopération internationale en recherche agronomique pour le développement) is an agricultural research and international cooperation organisation working for the sustainable development of tropical and Mediterranean regions. It is a public industrial and commercial establishment (EPIC) founded in 1984, with its Head Office in Paris.

CIRAD has two research centres in mainland France, one in Montpellier (Lavalette campus) and the other in nearby Montferrier-sur-Lez (Baillarguet campus) and research stations in the French overseas regions. Through its 14 regional offices spread over every continent, CIRAD works with more than 100 countries.

== History ==
CIRAD was founded in 1984 from nine tropical research institutes, most dating back to the 1940s.

== Remit ==
CIRAD's main task is to contribute to rural development in tropical and subtropical countries through research activities, experimentation, training (in France and overseas) and the dissemination of scientific and technical information. It works with more than 100 countries in Africa, Asia, the Pacific, Latin America and Europe. Its operations are conducted at its own centres and those belonging to its partners overseas. CIRAD makes its scientific and institutional expertise available to fuel public policy in partner countries and the global debate on the main issues surrounding agriculture. It also supports French scientific diplomacy.

Its operations are framed by six priority research topics: Agroecological transitions; Biodiversity, Climate change; Food systems; One Health and Territories and collective action, and focus on 16 tropical agricultural value chains: Animal production; Banana and plantain; Cocoa; Coffee; Coconut; Cotton; Dairy; Forest resources; Horticulture; Legumes; Oil palm; Rice; Roots and tubers; Rubber; Sorghum and millet; Sugarcane.

== Human, material and financial resources ==
CIRAD has a staff of 1750 (including 1200 scientists).

Its annual operating budget totals 250 million euros, two thirds of which is covered by the State research and technological development budget (BCRD) and the remainder by contractual resources.

== Organisation ==
=== Scientific departments ===
CIRAD has three scientific departments:

- Biological Systems (BIOS)
- Performance of Tropical Production and Processing Systems (PERSYST)
- Environment and Societies (ES).

It is split into 33 research units: nine internal research units (UPRs), 23 joint research units (UMRs) and a service unit (US).

Since 2006, its publishing operations have been under the banner of Editions Quae.

CIRAD publishes several open-access journals:

- Bois & Forêts des Tropiques: international journal devoted to forestry science and techniques in hot regions. Articles are peer-reviewed and published in French or English.
- Revue d’élevage et de médecine vétérinaire des pays tropicaux: international scientific journal on livestock production, the environment and animal health in the Mediterranean and the tropics.
- Cahiers Agricultures: scientific journal, primarily in French, on farming systems worldwide, their evolution and their role in societies.
