= Joseph Charles Arthur =

American plant pathologist (1850–1942)

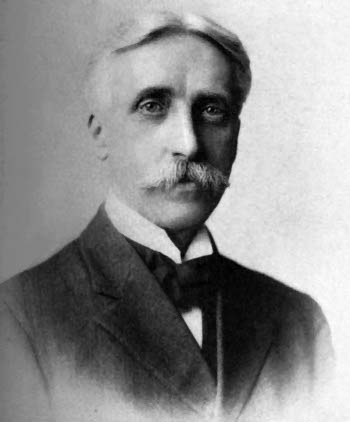
- Born: January 11, 1850; Lowville, New York
- Died: April 30, 1942 (aged 92); Brook, Indiana
- Known for: science of parasitic rust fungi
- Scientific career
- Fields: Plant pathology, mycology
- Author abbrev. (botany): Arthur

Joseph Charles Arthur (January 11, 1850 – April 30, 1942) was a pioneer American plant pathologist and mycologist best known for his work with the parasitic rust fungi (Pucciniales). He was a charter member of the Botanical Society of America, the Mycological Society of America, and the American Phytopathological Society. He was an elected member of both the American Philosophical Society and the American Academy of Arts and Sciences. He was a recipient of the first Doctorate in Sciences awarded by Cornell University. The standard author abbreviation Arthur is used to indicate this person as the author when citing a botanical name.

== Biography ==
Joseph Charles (“JC”) Arthur (1850–1942) was born in Lowville, New York, on January 11, 1850. Early in his childhood, his family moved to a farm near Charles City, Iowa, where he grew up. It was during that time that Arthur developed an interest in flowering plants. He was one of the first students to enroll at Iowa State College (now University) in 1869. Due to his interest in plants, he planned to study botany during college. Much to his dismay, no botanists were at Iowa State during his first year. In his second year, botanist Charles E. Bessey obtained a professorship at Iowa State and it was under his guidance that Arthur began his formal study of botany. To help facilitate Arthur’s studies, Bessey purchased a rust collection from the herbarium of Moses A. Curtis. Arthur graduated from Iowa State in 1872.

In 1876, Arthur took a position as an instructor at Iowa State. He published his first paper that year, which was a catalog of the flowering plants of Iowa. It was during this time that he met E.W.D Holway, another noted botanist and mycologist. The two became friends and colleagues until Holway’s death in 1923. In 1877, Arthur received his Master's of Science (M.S.) at Iowa State. After that, he studied briefly at Harvard and Johns Hopkins University. From 1879 to 1881, Arthur was an instructor at the University of Wisconsin and then at the University of Minnesota during the following year.

After his year in Minnesota, Arthur became the first botanist to work at the New York State Agricultural Experiment Station in Geneva, New York. This appointment was the first of its kind in the United States. There, most of his work was with bacterial or fire blight of pear. He was the first to establish that bacteria can cause plant disease. He was also the first plant pathologist to successfully execute Koch's postulates.

In 1885, while still at the New York Agricultural Experiment Station, he went to an AAAS meeting in New York City. During a break, botanist L.M. Underwood took Arthur to a pasture in the Bronx that was to become the future site of the New York Botanical Garden. Underwood confided in Arthur that the Garden was spearheading an effort to publish systematic descriptions of the entire North American flora and Arthur was most likely going to be in charge of the section on rust fungi. Arthur was elated by this news, as was the New York Agricultural Experiment Station where he was granted increased freedom to study rusts. For his part, Arthur joined a consortium of collaborators to write 12 parts of the North American Flora, totaling 884 pages of descriptions, measurements, and host and distribution records of rust fungi. The first part was published in 1907 and the last in 1931.

The year after Arthur earned his Doctor of Science from Cornell in 1886, he was appointed professor of botany at Purdue University, where he remained until his retirement in 1915. He was also the first botanist at the Purdue University Agricultural Experiment Station. Purdue continued to support his contribution to the North American Flora. One of his first accomplishments while at Purdue was determining that formalin could be used as a fungicide to control potato scab.

It was at Purdue where Arthur began over 19 years of culture experiments with American species of rusts. He was faced with the task of identifying a species concept appropriate for rust fungi, many of which exhibit up to five different spore types and can alternate between two hosts, known as heteroecism. The life cycle of rusts was not fully known for most species, so Arthur’s goal was to keep rusts under direct observation to note the succession of spore types. Heteroecism of North American rusts was unexplored at that point, so to find the alternate hosts for some species, he performed over 3750 inoculations with 2140 collections on potential hosts. Through those culture studies, Arthur realized the importance of host specialization to the delimitation of species. Arthur also introduced a greater emphasis on morphological, and especially microscopic characters, such as the number and arrangement of germpores on spores that had up to this point, not been considered in the taxonomy of rust fungi. Later, their taxonomic significance became shown.

During his career, Arthur named 29 genera and 309 species in the North American Flora, and described an additional 50 species from South America, India and the Philippines, many of which he obtained from the collections of Holway.

Arthur was a charter member of the Botanical Society of America (twice serving as President), the Mycological Society of America, American Phytopathological Society (where he also served as President), the American Association of University Professors, and many other learned societies.

His first paper on the rust fungi was published in 1883 and he continued publishing on the subject for over half of a century, his final publication appearing in 1934. With Holway he issued the exsiccata Uredineae exsiccatae et icones (1879–1902).

== Arthur Herbarium ==
During his tenure at Purdue, Arthur accumulated over 40,000 rust specimens. Although he housed them at Purdue, Arthur considered these specimens to be his property because he financed most out of his own pocket. When Purdue disagreed, Arthur hired moving vans and quietly packed up the entire herbarium, including cabinets, and moved it to his house. This caused a standoff with Winthrop E. Stone, President of Purdue, who directed that he return all of the specimens, papers, drawings and notes related to his work with the North American flora to the herbarium. Ultimately an agreement was reached between Arthur and the Trustees of Purdue University to reimburse Arthur for expenses he personally incurred to build and maintain the herbarium, paying him the grand sum of $1450 amounting to 3.5 cents per specimen.

Today the Arthur Herbarium is located at Lilly Hall of Science at Purdue University and it still houses Arthur's priceless collections. The collection has grown to almost 100,000 specimens of rust fungi and is considered one of the most important holdings of these fungi in the world. It is currently directed by Dr. M. Catherine Aime.

== Personal life ==
Arthur married Emily Stiles Potter of Lafayette, Indiana in 1901 and the two lived together until her death in 1935. His interests also extended into music. His premier piece was “Vive Purdue.” Arthur died in 1942 in Brook, Indiana. He is buried in Lafayette.

== See also ==
- List of mycologists
