= Urediniospore =

Thin-walled spores produced by the uredium

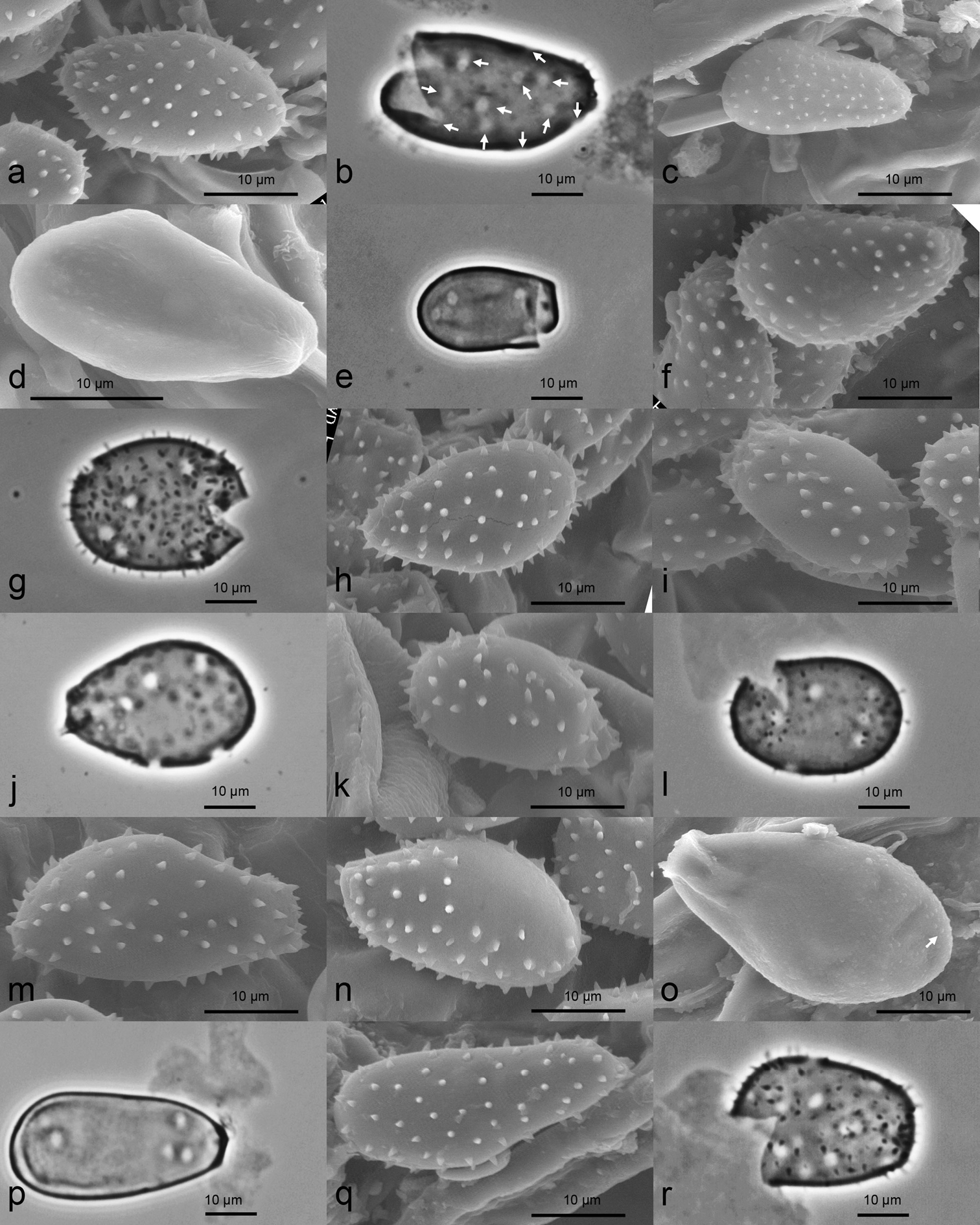
Urediniospores of 11 Milesina species. a Milesina blechni on Struthiopteris spicant b Milesina blechni on Struthiopteris spicant, cracked spore with released plasma, germ pores scattered c Milesina carpatica on Dryopteris filix-mas d Milesina exigua on Polystichum braunii, smooth surface e Milesina exigua on Polystichum braunii, smooth surface, plasma-free spore, germ pores bipolar f Milesina feurichii on Asplenium septentrionale with smooth areas on surface g Milesina feurichii on Asplenium septentrionale, cracked plasma-free spore, germ pores scattered h Milesina kriegeriana on Dryopteris carthusiana i Milesina magnusiana on Asplenium adiantum-nigrum with smooth areas on surface j Milesina magnusiana on Asplenium adiantum-nigrum, spore plasma-free, germ pores scattered k Milesina murariae on Asplenium ruta-muraria with smooth areas on surface l Milesina murariae on Asplenium ruta-muraria, cracked spore with released plasma, germ pores scattered m Milesina polypodii on Polypodium vulgare with smooth areas on surface n Milesina scolopendrii on Asplenium scolopendrium with smooth areas on surface o Milesina vogesiaca on Polystichum aculeatum, surface with very flat warts at the tip of the spore (arrow) p Milesina vogesiaca on Polystichum aculeatum, surface smooth (no warts visible at the tip), germ pores bipolar q Milesina whitei on Polystichum sp. r Milesina whitei on Polystichum setiferum, cracked spore with released plasma, germ pores scattered.

Urediniospores (or uredospores) are thin-walled spores produced by the uredium, a stage in the life-cycle of rusts.

== Development ==
Urediniospores develop in the uredium, generally on a leaf's under surface.

== Morphology ==
- Urediniospores usually have two dikaryote nuclei within one cell. In mass they are usually pale brown in contrast to teliospores which are generally dark brown.

== See also ==
- Chlamydospore
- Urediniomycetes
- Pycniospore
- Aeciospore
- Teliospore
- Ustilaginomycetes
- Rust fungus: Spores
