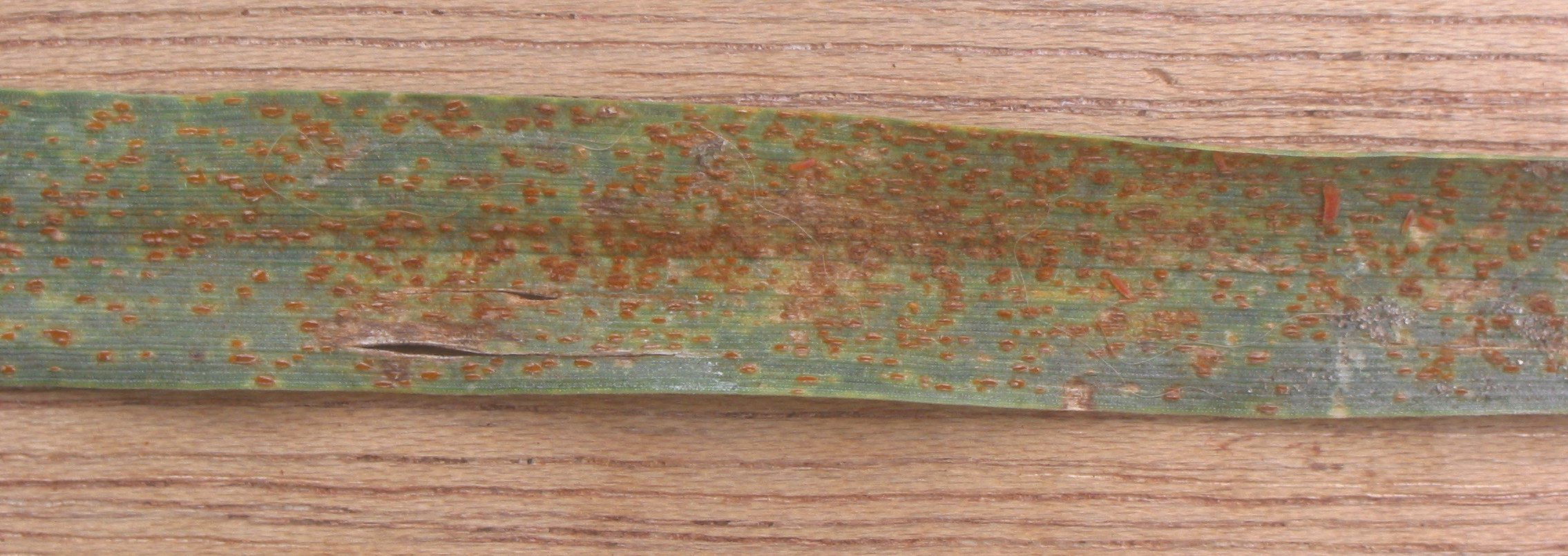
- Example of wheat leaf from a disease differential of Puccinia recondita f.sp. tritici

Scientific classification
- Kingdom: Fungi
- Division: Basidiomycota
- Class: Pucciniomycetes
- Order: Pucciniales

Families
- Araucariomycetaceae; (Chaconiaceae); Coleosporiaceae; (Cronartiaceae); Crossopsoraceae; Gymnosporangiaceae; Melampsoraceae; Milesinaceae; Ochropsoraceae; Phakopsoraceae; Phragmidiaceae; Pileolariaceae; Pucciniaceae; Pucciniosiraceae; Pucciniastraceae; Raveneliaceae; Rogerpetersoniaceae; Skierkaceae; Sphaerophragmiaceae; Tranzscheliaceae; (Uropyxidaceae); Zaghouaniaceae (incorporating Mikronegeriaceae); mitosporic Pucciniales and incertae sedis

= Rust (fungus) =

Rusts

Order of fungi

Rusts are fungal plant pathogens of the order Pucciniales (previously known as Uredinales) causing plant fungal diseases.

An estimated 168 rust genera and approximately 7,000 species, more than half of which belong to the genus Puccinia, are currently accepted. Rust fungi are highly specialized plant pathogens with several unique features. Taken as a group, rust fungi are diverse and affect many kinds of plants. However, each species has a range of hosts and cannot be transmitted to non-host plants. In addition, most rust fungi cannot be grown easily in pure culture.

Most species of rust fungi are able to infect two different plant hosts in different stages of their life cycle, and may produce up to five morphologically and cytologically distinct spore-producing structures viz., spermogonia, aecia, uredinia, telia, and basidia in successive stages of reproduction. Each spore type is very host-specific, and can typically infect only one kind of plant.

Rust fungi are obligate plant pathogens that only infect living plants. Infections begin when a spore lands on the plant surface, germinates, and invades its host. Infection is limited to plant parts such as leaves, petioles, tender shoots, stem, fruits, etc. Plants with severe rust infection may appear stunted, chlorotic (yellowed), or may display signs of infection such as rust fruiting bodies. Rust fungi grow intracellularly, and make spore-producing fruiting bodies within or, more often, on the surfaces of affected plant parts. Some rust species form perennial systemic infections that may cause plant deformities such as growth retardation, witch's broom, stem canker, galls, or hypertrophy of affected plant parts.

Rusts get their name because they are most commonly observed as deposits of powdery rust-coloured or brown spores on plant surfaces. The Roman agricultural festival Robigalia (April 25) has ancient origins in combating wheat rust.

== Biology ==
=== Life cycle ===
All rusts are obligate or biotrophic parasites, meaning that they require a living host to complete their life cycle. They generally do not kill the host plant but can severely reduce growth and yield. Cereal crops can be devastated in one season; oak trees infected in the main stem within their first five years by the rust Cronartium quercuum often die.

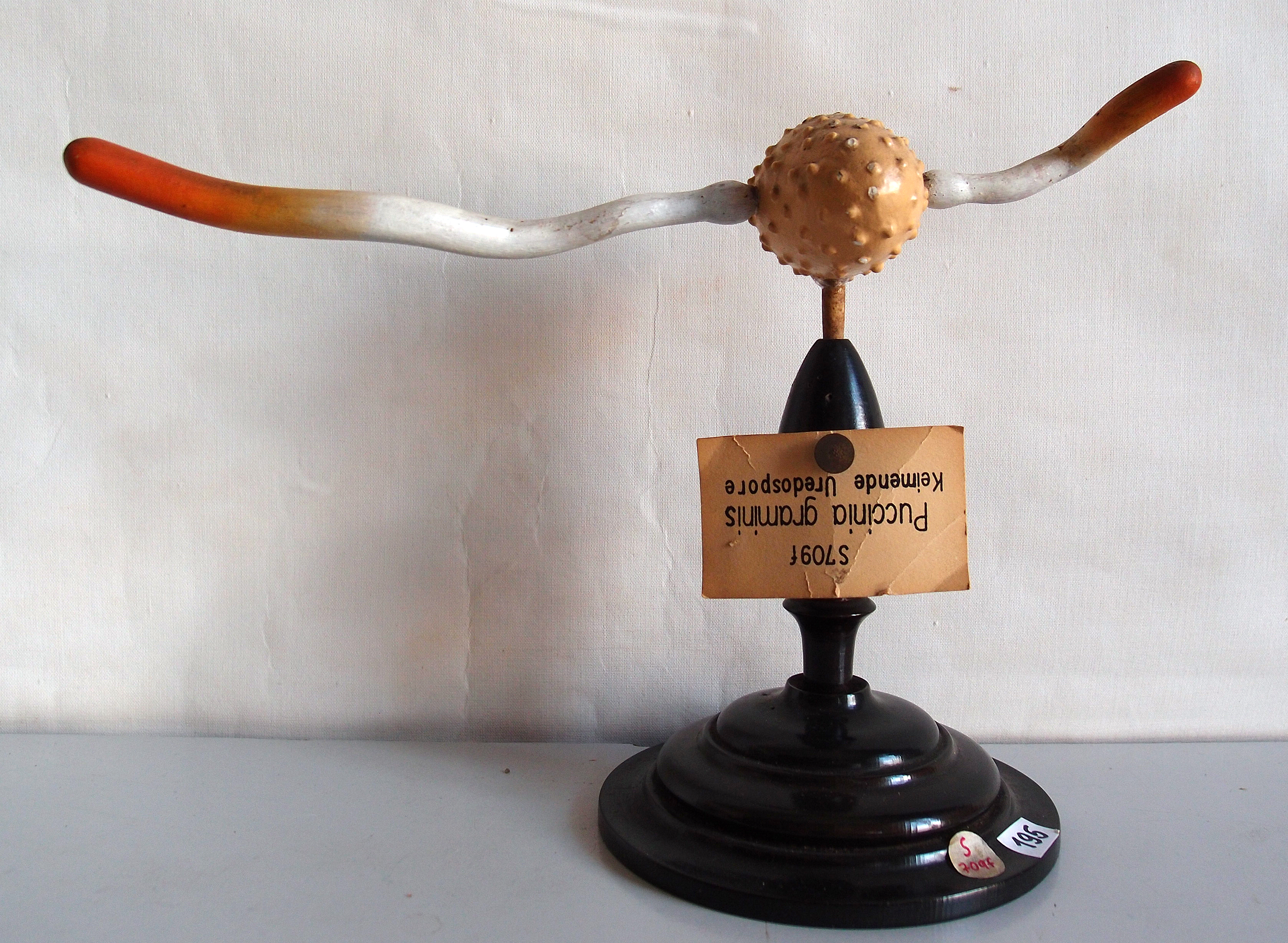
Germinating urediniospore of Puccinia graminis, model from the late 19th century, Botanical Museum Greifswald

Rust fungi can produce up to five spore types from corresponding fruiting body types during their life cycle, depending on the species. Roman numerals have traditionally been used to refer to these morphological types.

- 0-Pycniospores (Spermatia) from Pycnidia. These serve mainly as haploid gametes in heterothallic rusts.
- I-Aeciospores from Aecia. These serve mainly as non-repeating, dikaryotic, asexual spores, and go on to infect the primary host.
- II-Urediniospores from Uredinia. These serve as repeating dikaryotic vegetative spores. These spores are referred to as the repeating stage because they can cause auto-infection on the primary host, re-infecting the same host on which the spores were produced. They are often profuse, red/orange, and a prominent sign of rust disease.
- III-Teliospores from Telia. These dikaryotic spores are often the survival/overwintering stage of the life cycle. They usually do not infect a plant directly; instead they germinate to produce basidia and basidiospores.
- IV-Basidiospores from Teliospores. These windborne haploid spores often infect the alternate host in Spring. They are rarely observed outside of the laboratory.

Rust fungi are often categorized by their life cycle. Three basic types of life cycles are recognized based on the number of spore types as macrocyclic, demicyclic, and microcyclic. The macrocyclic life cycle has all spore states, the demicyclic lacks the uredinial state, and the microcyclic cycle lacks the basidial, pycnial, and the aecial states, thus possess only uredinia and telia. Spermagonia may be absent from each type but especially the microcyclic life cycle. In macrocyclic and demicyclic life cycles, the rust may be either host alternating (heteroecious) (i.e., the aecial stage is on one kind of plant but the telial stage on a different and unrelated plant), or single-host (autoecious) (i.e., the aecial and telial states on the same plant host). Heteroecious rust fungi require two unrelated hosts to complete their life cycle, with the primary host being infected by aeciospores and the alternate host being infected by basidiospores. This can be contrasted with an autoecious fungus, such as Puccinia porri, which can complete all parts of its life cycle on a single host species. Understanding the life cycles of rust fungi allows for proper disease management.

=== Host plant–rust fungus relationship ===
There are definite patterns of relationship with host plant groups and the rust fungi that parasitize them. Some genera of rust fungi, especially Puccinia and Uromyces, comprise species that are capable of parasitizing plants of many families. Other rust genera appear to be restricted to certain plant groups. Host restriction may, in heteroecious species, apply to both phases of life cycle or to only one phase. As with many pathogen/host pairs, rusts are often in gene-for-gene relationships with their plants. This rust-plant gene-for-gene interaction differs somewhat from other gene-for-gene situations and has its own quirks and agronomic significance. Rust fungi decrease photosynthesis and elicit the emissions of different stress volatiles with increasing severity of infection.

=== Infection process ===
The spores of rust fungi may be dispersed by wind, water or insect vectors. When a spore encounters a susceptible plant, it can germinate and infect plant tissues. A rust spore typically germinates on a plant surface, growing a short hypha called a germ tube. This germ tube may locate a stoma by a touch responsive process known as thigmotropism. This involves orienting to ridges created by epidermal cells on the leaf surface, and growing directionally until it encounters a stoma.

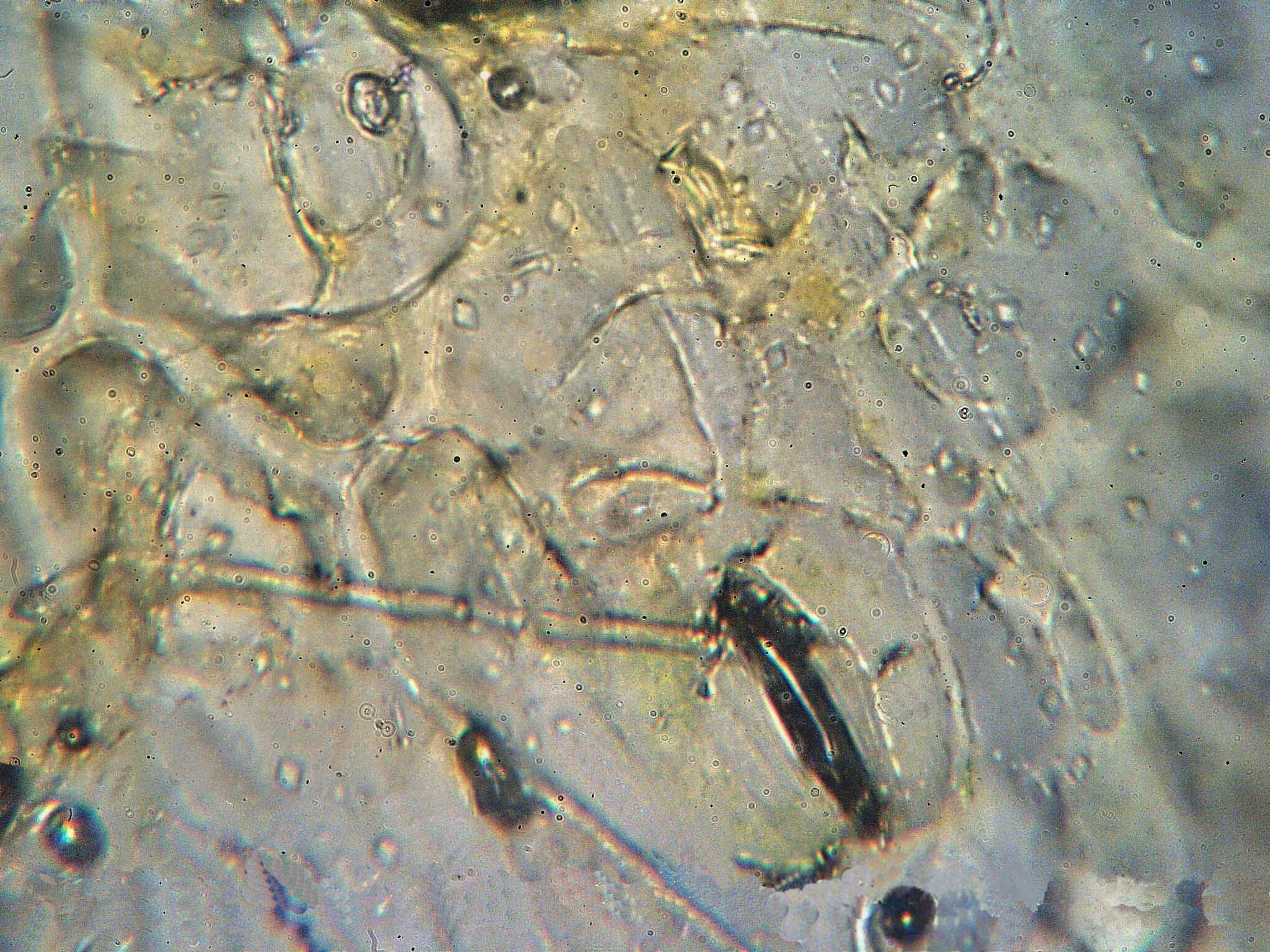
Rust hypha attacking stoma (1600x magnification)

Over the stoma, a hyphal tip produces an infection structure called an appressorium. From the underside of an appressorium, a slender hypha grows downward to infect plant cells. It is thought that the whole process is mediated by stretch-sensitive calcium ion channels located in the tip of the hypha, which produce electric currents and alter gene expression, inducing appressorium formation.

Once the fungus has invaded the plant, it grows into plant mesophyll cells, producing specialized hyphae known as haustoria. The haustoria penetrate cell walls but not cell membranes: plant cell membranes invaginate around the main haustorial body forming a space known as the extra-haustorial matrix. An iron- and phosphorus-rich neck band bridges the plant and fungal membranes in the space between the cells for water flow, known as the apoplast, thus preventing the nutrients reaching the plant's cells. The haustorium contains amino acid- and hexose sugar- transporters and H^{+}-ATPases which are used for active transport of nutrients from the plant, nourishing the fungus. The fungus continues growing, penetrating more and more plant cells, until spore growth occurs. The process repeats every 10–14 days, producing numerous spores that can be spread to other parts of the same plant, or to new hosts.

=== Hyperparasites of rusts ===
In the family Sphaeropsidaceae of Sphaeropsidales fungi, species of the genus Darluca are hyperparasites on rusts.

== Impact ==
Rusts are among the most harmful pathogens to agriculture, horticulture and forestry. Rust fungi are major concerns and limiting factors for successful cultivation of agricultural and forest crops. White pine blister rust, wheat stem rust, soybean rust, and coffee rust are examples of notoriously damaging threats to economically important crops. Climate change may increase the prevalence of some rust species while causing others to decline through increased CO_{2} and O_{3}, changes to temperature and humidity, and enhanced spore dispersal due to more frequent extreme weather events.

Several common species in agriculture include:

- Cronartium ribicola (white pine blister rust); the primary hosts are currants, and white pines the secondary. Heterocyclic and macrocyclic
- Gymnosporangium juniperi-virginianae (cedar-apple rust); Juniperus virginiana is the primary (telial) host and apple, pear or hawthorn is the secondary (aecial) host. Heteroecious and demicyclic
- Hemileia vastatrix (coffee rust); primary host is coffee plant; unknown alternate host. Heteroecious
- Phakopsora meibomiae and P. pachyrhizi (soybean rust); primary host is soybean and various legumes. Unknown alternate host. Heteroecious
- Puccinia coronata (crown rust of oats and ryegrass); oats are the primary host; Rhamnus spp. (Buckthorn) is alternate host. Heteroecious and macrocyclic
- P. graminis (stem rust of wheat and Kentucky bluegrass, or black rust of cereals); primary hosts include: Kentucky bluegrass, barley, and wheat; Common barberry is the alternate host. Heteroecious and macrocyclic
- P. hemerocallidis (daylily rust); daylily is primary host; Patrinia sp is alternate host. Heteroecious and macrocyclic
- P. kuehnii (orange rust of sugarcane)
- P. melanocephala (brown rust of sugarcane)
- P. porri (leek rust); Autoecious
- P. sorghi (common rust of corn)
- P. striiformis (yellow rust) of cereals
- P. triticina (brown wheat rust) in grains
- Uromyces appendiculatus (bean rust) in common bean (Phaseolus vulgaris)

=== Host plants affected ===
It is probable that most plant species are affected by some species of rust. Rusts are often named after a host species that they infect. For example; Puccinia xanthii infects the flowering plant cocklebur (Xanthium). Recently, a total of 95 rust fungi belonging to 25 genera associated with 117 forest plant species belonging to 80 host genera under 43 host families were reported from the Western Ghats, Kerala, India. Rust fungi include:

- Aecidium
- Cerotelium
- Chaconia
- Coleosporium
- Crossopsora
- Didymopsorella
- Hamspora
- Hapalophragmidium
- Hemileia
- Kernkampella
- Kuehneola
- Kweilingia
- Macabuna
- Maravalia
- Melampsora
- Olivea
- Physopella
- Puccinia
- Ravenelia
- Uraecium
- Uredo
- Uredopeltis
- Uromyces
- Xenostele
- Zaghouania

Rust infected host genera include:

- Acacia
- Acalypha
- Ageratina
- Albizia
- Arundinaria
- Bambusa
- Bidens
- Blepharis
- Bombax
- Bridelia
- Callicarpa
- Canarium
- Canthium
- Catunaragam
- Cinnamomum
- Cissus
- Cleistanthus
- Clerodendron
- Coffea
- Coix
- Cosmostigma
- Crotalaria
- Dalbergia
- Dendrocalamus
- Derris
- Diospyros
- Dipterocanthus
- Elaeagnus
- Elephantopus
- Elettaria
- Eragrostis
- Euphorbia
- Ficus
- Flacourtia
- Grewia
- Holarrhena
- Holoptelia
- Hypericum
- Ichnocarpus
- Ischaemum
- Jasminum
- Justicia
- Loesneriella
- Luvunga
- Meiogyne
- Meliosma
- Mimusops
- Morus
- Neolitzea
- Ocimum
- Olea
- Oxalis
- Pavetta
- Persicaria
- Phyllanthus
- Plectranthus
- Plumeria
- Pongamia
- Premna
- Protasparagus
- Rubus
- Salix
- Spondia
- Strobilanthes
- Strychnos
- Tabernaemontana
- Terminalia
- Toddalia
- Trichosanthes
- Vernonia
- Vigna
- Wrightia
- Xanthophyllum
- Xylia
- Ziziphus

Some of the better known hosts include:

- Arisaema triphyllum, Jack-in-the-pulpit
- Avena sativa, Oats
- Berberis vulgaris, Common barberry
- Vicia faba - Broad beans
- Coffea arabica - Coffee
- Crataegus monogyna - Hawthorn
- Chrysanthemum
- Cydonia - Quince
- Euphorbia maculata, Spotted Spurge
- Fuchsia spp,
- Garlic
- Hordeum vulgare, Barley
- Juniperus virginiana, Red Cedar (Juniper apple disease)
- Juniperus communis - Juniper
- Allium ampeloprasum - Leek
- Malus – Apple
- Mentha piperita - Peppermint
- Mespilus - Medlar
- Onion
- Pelargonium
- Primula veris
- Primula vulgaris
- Pyrus - Pear
- Rosa spp, Roses
- Triticum spp., Wheat
- Oxalis spp., Oxalis
- Secale cereale, Rye
- Senecio vulgaris -Common groundsel
- Xanthium canadense Cocklebur

== Management ==
=== Research ===
Efforts to control rusts began to be scientifically based in the 20th century. Elvin C. Stakman initiated the scientific study of host resistance, which had heretofore been poorly understood and handled by individual growers as part of the breeding process. Stakman was followed by H. H. Flor's extensive discoveries of rust genetics. In order to study rust metabolics, Tervet et al., 1951 developed the Cyclone Separator. The cyclone separator uses the cyclonic separation mechanism to allow the mechanised collection of spores for study – Cherry & Peet 1966's improved version gathers even more efficiently. This device was first put to work testing the composition of the spores themselves, especially substances coating the outside of the spores which signal population density. When detected they help prevent crowding.

Gene cloning and other methods of genetic engineering can provide a much wider range of R genes and other sources of rust resistance – with reduced delay before deployment – if regulation of genetic engineering permits.

=== Control ===
The control methods of rust fungus diseases depend largely on the life cycle of the particular pathogen. The following are examples of disease management plans used to control macrocyclic and demicyclic diseases:

Macrocyclic disease: Developing a management plan for this type of disease depends largely on whether the urediniospores (rarely termed the "repeating stage") occur on the economically important host plant or the alternate host. For example, the repeating stage in white pine blister rust disease does not occur on white pines but on the alternate host, Ribes spp. During August and September Ribes spp. give rise to teliospores which infect white pines. Removal of the alternate host disrupts the life cycle of the rust fungi Cronartium ribicola, preventing the formation of basidiospores which infect the primary host. Although spores from white pines cannot infect other white pines, survival spores may overwinter on infected pines and reinfect Ribes spp. the following season. Infected tissue is removed from white pines and strict quarantines of Ribes spp. are maintained in high risk areas.

Puccinia graminis is a macrocyclic heteroecious fungus that causes wheat stem rust disease. The sexual stage in this fungus occurs on the alternate host – barberry – and not wheat. The durable spore type produced on the alternate host allows the disease to persist in wheat even in more inhospitable environments. Planting resistant crops will prevent disease, however, virulence mutations will give rise to new strains of fungi that overcome plant resistance. Although the disease cannot be stopped by removal of the alternate host, the life cycle is disrupted and the rate of evolution is decreased because of reduced genetic recombination. This allows resistance bred crops to remain effective for a longer period of time.

Demicyclic disease: Because there is no repeating stage in the life cycle of demicyclic fungi, removal of the primary or the alternate host will disrupt the disease cycle. This method, however, is not highly effective in managing all demicyclic diseases. Cedar-apple rust disease, for example, can persist despite removal of one of the hosts since spores can be disseminated from long distances. The severity of cedar-apple rust disease can be managed by removal of basidiospore producing galls from junipers or the application of protective fungicides to junipers.

In some large acreage crops, fungicides are applied by air. The process is expensive and fungicide application is best reserved for seasons when foliar diseases are severe. Research indicates, the higher the foliar disease severity, the greater the return from the use of fungicides. Southern corn rust disease, can be confused with common rust. Southern rust's distinguishing characteristic is that pustules form mostly on the upper leaf surface and spores are more orange in color. Southern rust spreads more quickly and has a higher economic impact when hot, humid weather conditions persist. Timely fungicide applications to control southern rust are more crucial than with common rust.

A variety of preventative methods can be employed for rust diseases:

- High moisture levels may exacerbate rust disease symptoms. The avoidance of overhead watering at night, using drip irrigation, reducing crop density, and using fans to circulate air flow may decrease disease severity.
- The use of rust-resistant plant varieties
- Crop rotation can break the disease cycle because many rusts are host-specific and do not persist long without their host.
- Inspection of imported plants and cuttings for symptoms. It is important to continually inspect the plants because rust diseases have a latent period (plant has the disease but shows no symptoms).
- Use of disease-free seed can reduce incidence for some rusts

== Gallery ==
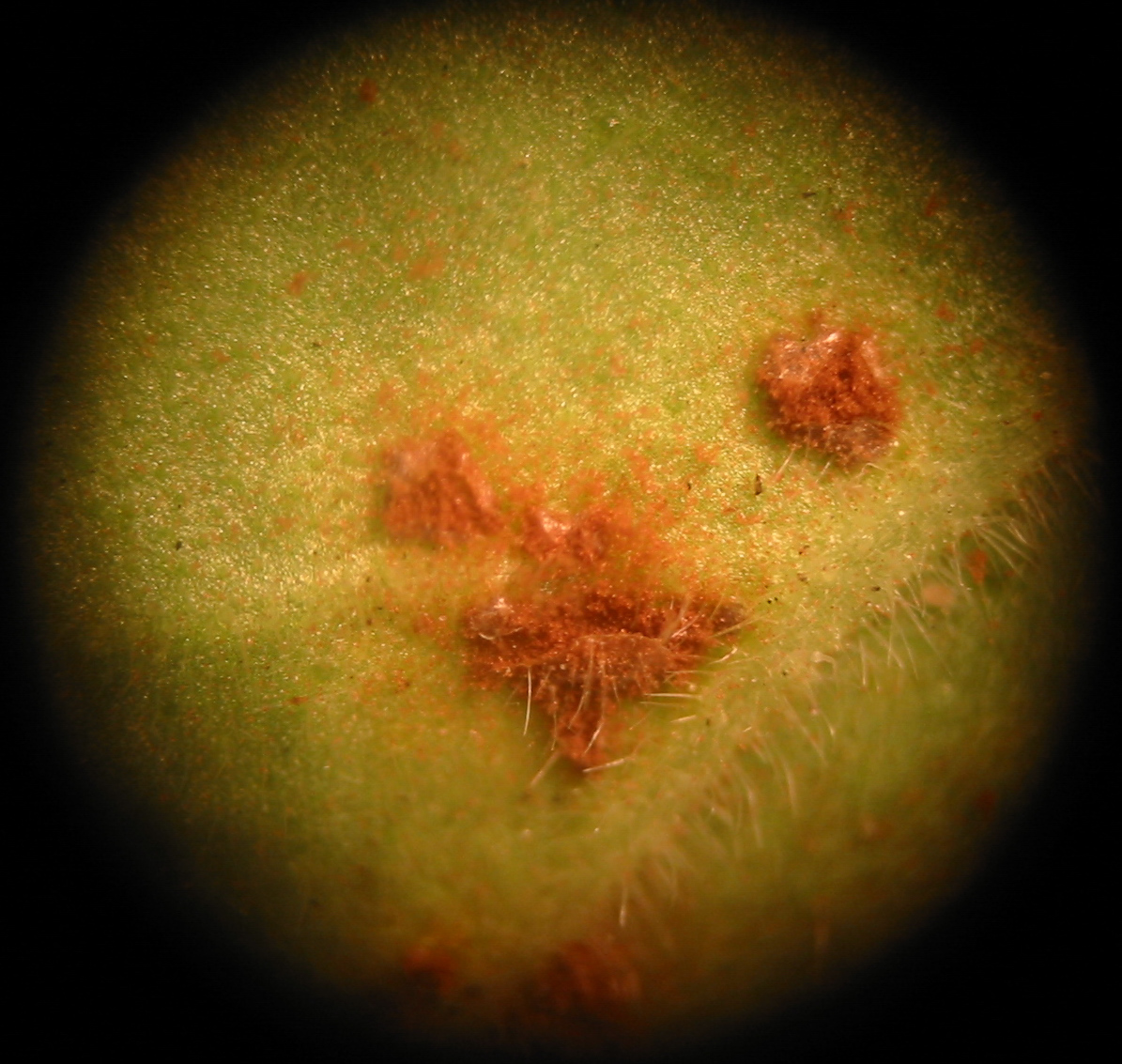
Rust fungus on a leaf, under low magnification

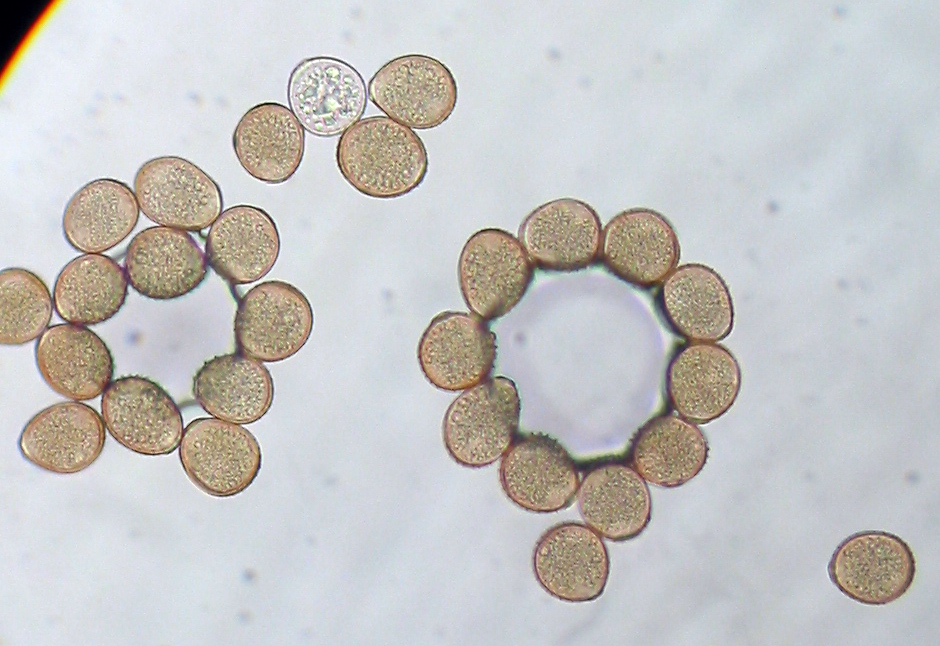
Urediniospores of a rust fungus

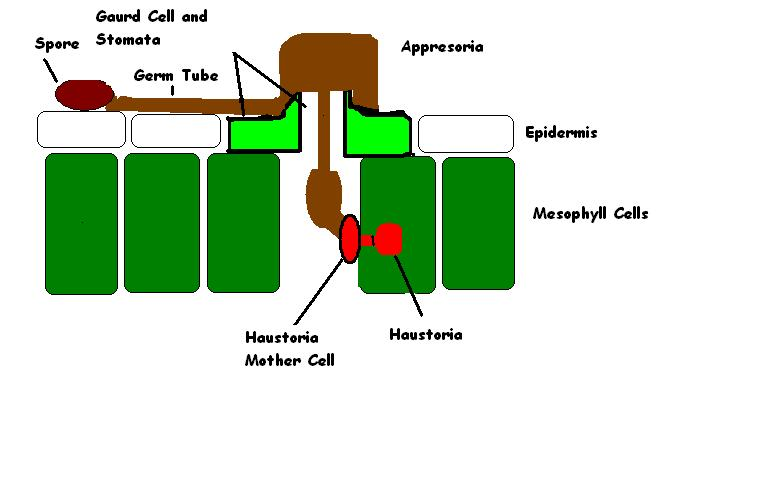
Diagram representing the infection process of rust fungi

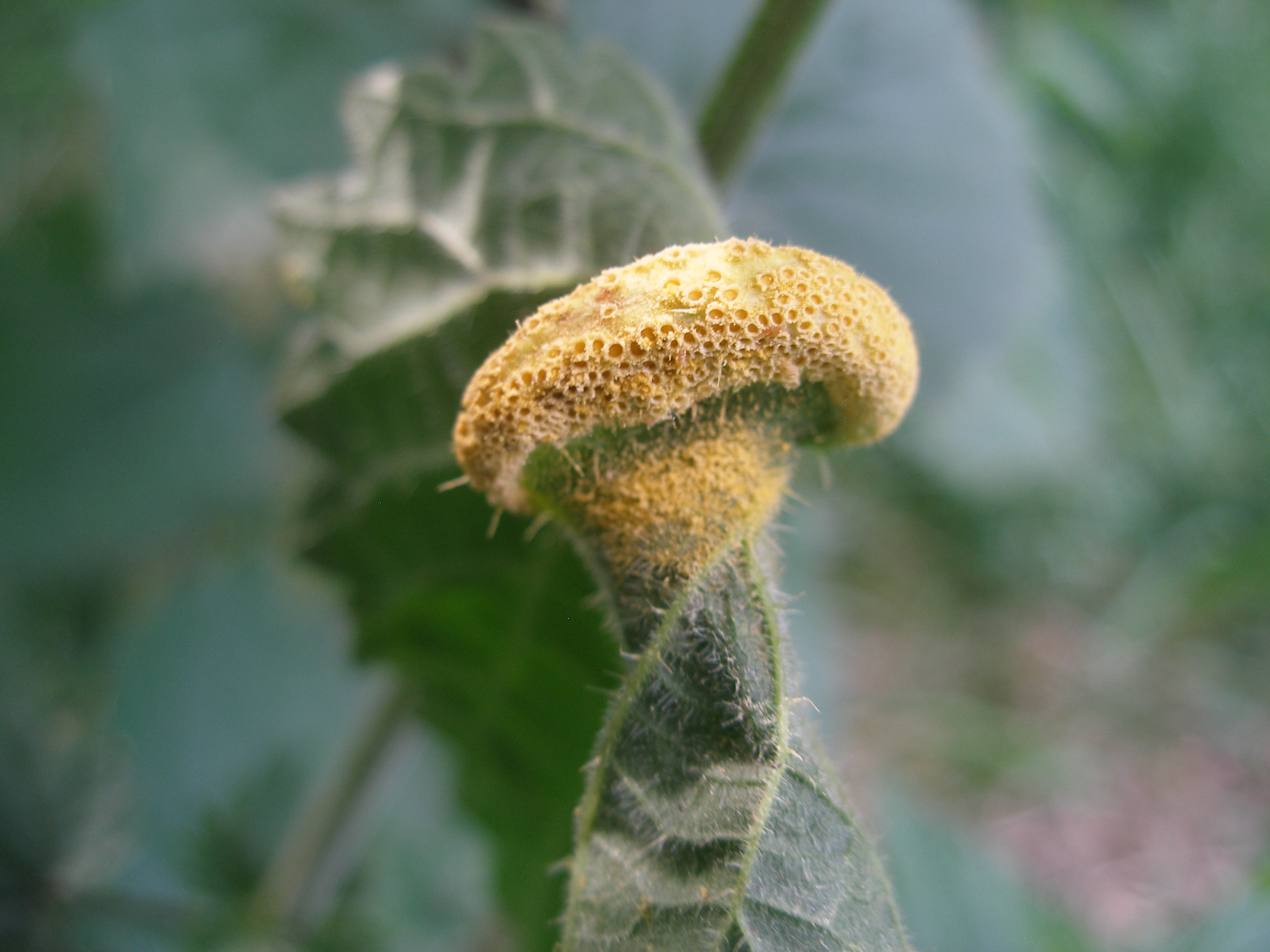
Rust fungus, Puccinia urticata on the surface of a nettle leaf

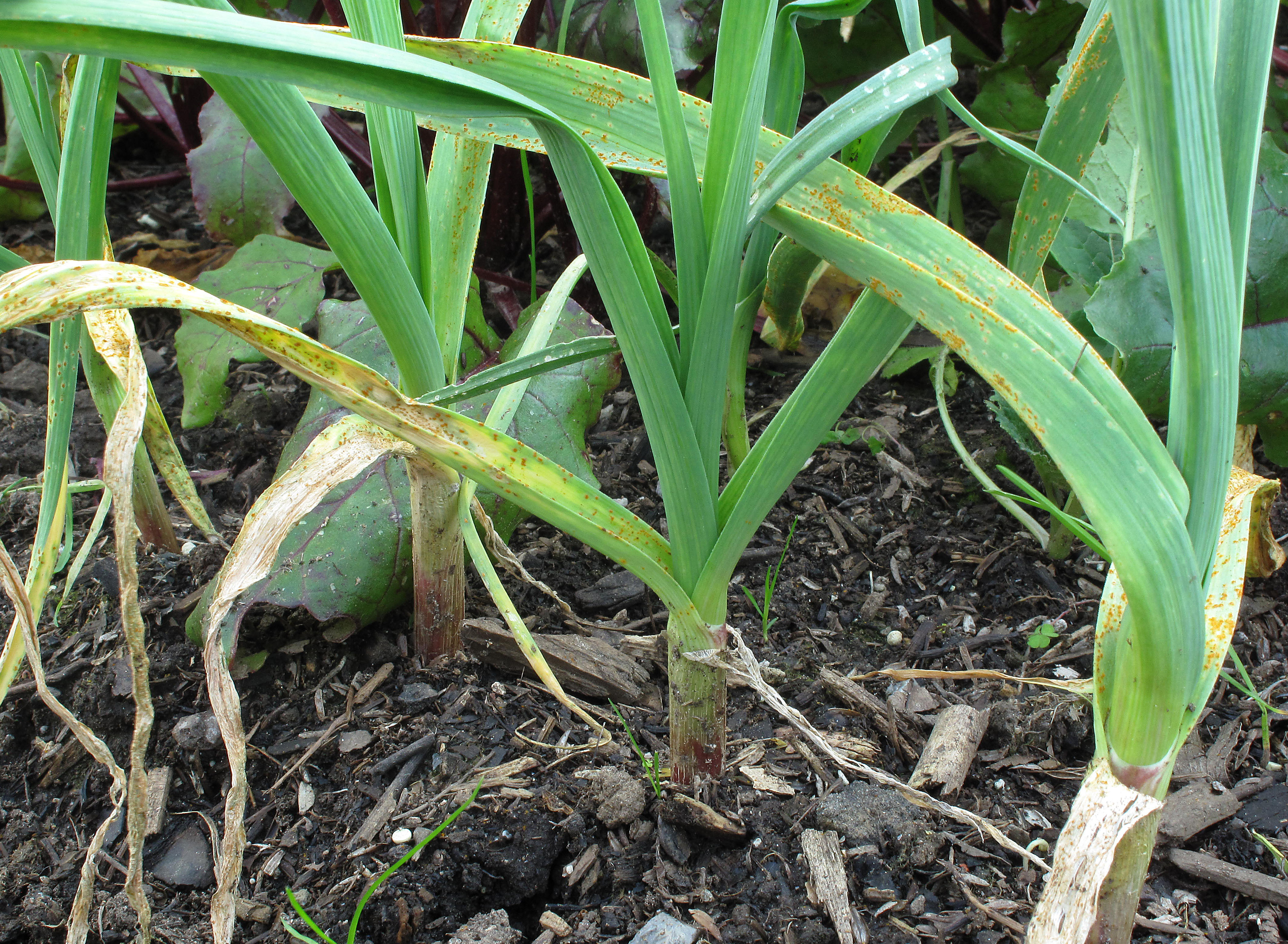
Rust on onions

== See also ==
- Fungus
- Leaf rust (barley)
- Rust (programming language) (named after the Rust fungus)
- Smut (fungus)
- Soybean rust
- Stem rust
- Wheat leaf rust
