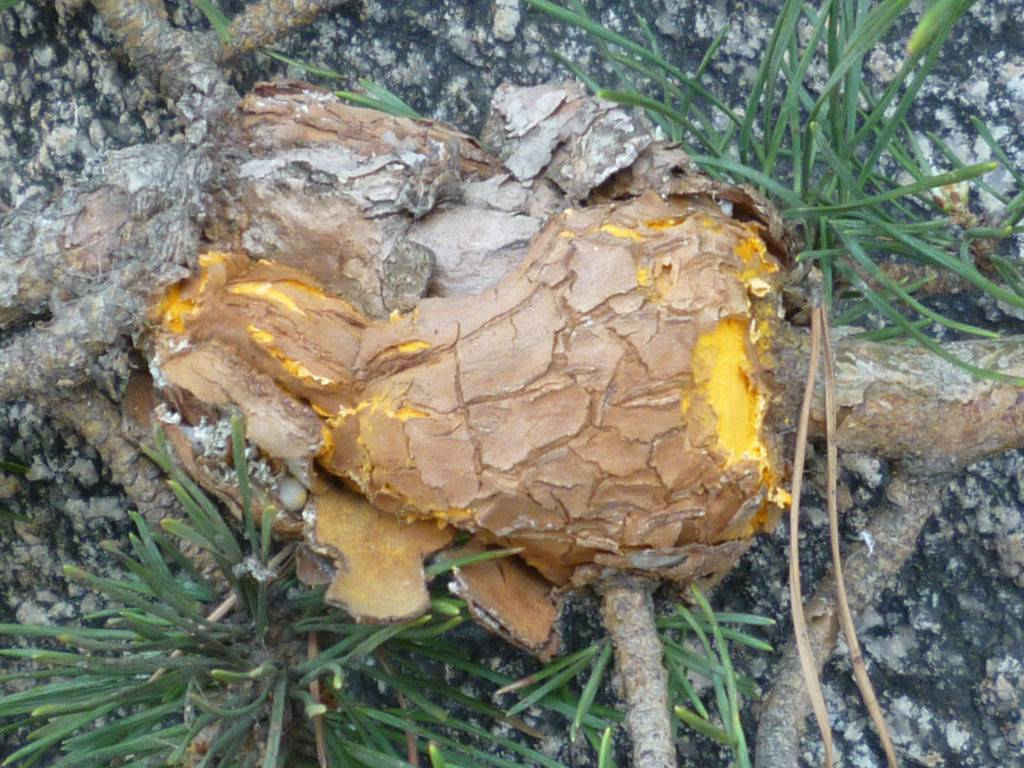

Scientific classification
- Kingdom: Fungi
- Division: Basidiomycota
- Class: Pucciniomycetes
- Order: Pucciniales
- Family: Cronartiaceae
- Genus: Cronartium
- Species: C. harknessii

Binomial name
- Cronartium harknessii (J.P.Moore) E. Meinecke (1920)

Synonyms
- Peridermium harknessii J.P.Moore (1884); Endocronartium harknessii (J.P.Moore) Hirats. (1969)

= Western gall rust =

Fungal disease of pine trees

Western gall rust, also known as pine-pine gall rust, is a fungal disease of pine trees. It is caused by Cronartium harknessii (formerly known as Endocronartium harknessii or Peridermium harknessii (describing the aecial phase under the now-superseded system of dual nomenclature), an autoecious, endocyclic, rust fungus that grows in the vascular cambium of the host. The disease is found on pine trees (Pinus spp.) with two or three needles, such as ponderosa pine, jack pine and scots pine. It is very similar to pine-oak gall rust, but its second host is another Pinus species. The fungal infection results in gall formation on branches or trunks of infected hosts. Gall formation is typically not detrimental to old trees, but has been known to kill younger, less stable saplings. Galls can vary from small growths on branch extremities to grapefruit-sized galls on trunks.

== Hosts and symptoms ==
The hosts of the aecial stage of the fungus includes two and three needled Pinus spp. The most important aecial hosts include jack pine (P. banksiana), lodgepole pine (P. contorta), western yellow pine (P. ponderosa), and the European Scots pine (P. sylvestris). A variety of other pines, such as Pinus nigra, P. mugo, P. palustris, P. banksiana, P. muricata, and P. radiata have also been reported as hosts to western gall rust (C. harknessii), but these pine species are considered less valuable. Because C. harknessii is an autoecious short-cycle rust lacking telial a host, there is no alternative hosts. The pathogen can infect actively growing shoots of any age very quickly without infecting an alternative host, making the disease cycle more destructive that typical rust species that switch between hosts. This also prevents control of the fungus by management of the alternative host species.

Symptoms of western gall rust can be quite conspicuous and are useful for diagnostic identification. The most prominent symptoms are hip cankers and swollen, spherical to oblong growths (galls) on the branches, stems, or main trunk of the host. The galls on small twigs of 1–2 years of age are often pear-shaped. Gall formation results from the overproduction of xylem tissue stimulated by the fungus. Witches brooming occasionally occurs along with galling. The bark on large galls will slough off over time, exposing the smooth wood beneath. Signs of western gall rust include the pale yellow aecia (1–8 mm in diameter) formed on galls in spring as well as the yellow-orange aeciospores contained within. Immature galls are spindle-shaped. Infections usually occur on more succulent (thick) branches. When mature, galls can grow as large as a softball (30.5 cm circumference), but most are the size of a golf ball (4.2 cm). Before the production of spores, the needles on highly infected branches become chlorotic or red, eventually turning brown when the branch dies. Western gall rust can cause dwarfing to occur if leader stem of younger pines are infected. Early identification of the disease is important for treatment, but is often hard to diagnose due to the inconspicuous initial symptoms and a lack of galls until the second year. A red pigmentation may develop on the epidermal galls of P. contorta seedlings 14–28 days after infection, but this is not always a reliable indicator.

== Disease cycle ==
Western gall rust has characteristically brown to yellow-orange sori visible on large globular galls on pines. Gall formation on trunks occurs over 2–4 years and is stimulated by the pathogen, which causes cells to grow and divide quickly at the site of initial infection. When mature, the gall splits open and the yellow-orange aeciospores are dispersed and carried to new hosts by wind. Because P. harknessii does not require an alternate host, the aeciospores can infect another pine directly. This typically occurs during moist conditions and rarely infects older shoots. Infection continues on the host shoots and needles until they have reached 90% of their elongation. Gall mortality is associated with squirrel feeding or invasion and inactivation by secondary organisms. The life cycle of C. harkknessii is different from other pine stem rust in that it is autoecious, making large stands of pines ideal hosts for survival and reproduction of the fungus.

Wind carries teliospores to pines shoots that then germinate under cool humid conditions, producing germ tubes with up to three side branches that act as basidia. The basidium directly penetrate the cuticle and epidermis. Other pines rusts like Cronartium ribicola and C. comandrae infect through the stomata. After penetration and establishment of a intracellular infection structure, primary hyphae are produced, infecting the epidermis and cortex intercellularly. Haustoria extend through neighboring cells and the cortex to reach the vascular cambium before the host becomes dormant follow the first infection season. The cambium is invade inwardly through the phloem and cortex, as opposed to a vertical or peripheral hyphael growth. Initiation of gall formation is through exogenous stimulation of the cambium and pith rays, causing an increased production of ray parenchyma. The host reacts by hyperplasia (increased division) providing the resources needed for further hyphae proliferation in the cortex, phloem, and cambium until the galls death. The gall will enlarge for 2 years and sporulate on the third. Spermogonia ooze from infected bark in early spring, but they are non-functional since they do not form aecia (vestigial). Dikaryotization of the haploid mycelium that produce the teliospores takes place in the outer cortex, just beneath the first periderm. They are surrounded by a membrane called a peridium that bursts, releasing the spores. Stimulation of dikaryotization is not understood, though it is likely a combination of host sap flow and environmental cues.

== Environment ==
Damp surfaces on these pine trees provide an environment conducive to spore germination; these surfaces are usually found on very young tissue of the current season's growth. The proper conditions must persist for at least 24 hours after the spore lands on its host in order to allow enough time for germination, penetration of host defenses, and establishment of the fungus. Environmental conditions conducive to infection typically occur during spring and early summer when weather is consistently cool and moist. Because of the very specific conditions required for spore germination and infection, western gall rust may not be observed in consecutive years as it is unlikely that optimal weather conditions and susceptible host tissue are both present at the time of spore release. Furthermore, infection severity is not uniform year after year. Only minor infections occur in an ordinary year, however infection may be prolific in certain years if the proper conditions occur. These years of abundant infection are termed "wave years" and are characterized by consistent cool, wet conditions and the increased local sporulation C. harknessii. Favorable conditions for large outbreaks of western gall rust do not occur often, but when they do they can affect areas as large as an entire state. Localized outbreaks are much more common, occurring in dense even-aged stands.

== Management ==
Good cultural practices to prevent western gall rust include removal of dense patches of grasses, weeds, and brush near susceptible trees, as they may prevent good spray coverage of the lower whorl (spiraling pattern) of branches. Severely infected trees should be rogued and burned to prevent further spread of inoculum. It is often difficult to detect infection in trees before symptoms such as stunting, chlorosis, and witch's brooming are evident. Until all diseased trees in the area are diagnosed and destroyed it is suggested that a protectant fungicide be applied to all susceptible trees in the stand. Using a registered systemic fungicide such as Bayleton (50% Dry Flowable Fungicide, EPA Reg. No. 2135-32) registered in California can help control western gall rust, although it is not used on seeds or seedlings and may kill mycorrhizal fungi if advised application concentration is exceeded.

If trees in a commercial stand are only lightly infected it is possible to prevent an increase in galling by applying a fungicidal spray, allowing the tree to reach cutting age so that it may be harvested. Copper-based and manganese-based fungicides have proven effective in the field but the sensitivity of P. harnknessii to these fungicides has not yet been researched in a laboratory setting. It has been demonstrated that development of the rust fungus is closely synchronized with Pinus sylvestris. Spore dissemination begins when needles start to emerge from the fascicle sheaths and has finished when the needles have grown to three-quarters of their final length. This provides a basis for the timing of the application of fungicides either before or during sporulation, depending on the chemicals mode of action.

Other chemical applications like Armada 50 WDG at 9 oz/100 gal water or Dithane M45 at 2 to 4 lb/A or per 100 gal water to protect bud breakthrough in seedlings that would have severely altered growth and diminished marketability. Although pruning infected stems from the tree may lower the initial inoculum, it provided little benefit to lesioned branches as they often die. The best time to prune is during the late dormant seasons like winter when insects and infections are less likely. For infections during warmer weathered seasons, apply. If left untouched, branches with galls will eventually become necrotic. Infected tissue that has not been removed will continue to sporulate until the host tissue has dried out. There is also some evidence that rodents strip the wood from galls, but it is uncommon to see this result in further spread of the disease or death of the gall. Insects frequently associate with the gall rust as well. Some feed on the aeciospores and can negatively impact the fungus' survival while other insects, like the red turpentine beetle, can carry spores to other trees. Large populations of the beneficial insects in the environment could potentially aid in suppressing a large outbreak of western gall rust.

== Importance ==
Western gall rust is especially important in areas containing large stands of pine species due to ability of the causal fungus to infect other pines without first infecting an alternate host. Western gall rust is economically significant because of its detrimental effects on lumber content, quality, and growth rate. Though the disease is not known to wipe out entire stands, it can kill individual trees. Due to the density of trees within managed stands on tree farms the disease can be much more severe. western gall rust is also an important disease for nursery owners growing pines to look out for because young trees and seedlings are particularly susceptible. Severe outbreaks in natural stands and plantations of Pinus contorta, P. ponderosa, P. banksiana, and P. sylvestris have been observed in regions of Canada. In the US, the most significant damage occurs in commercial stands of P. contorta in the Rocky Mountains. The disease is also significant due to its negative impact on the aesthetic quality of specimen trees in public gardens, arboretums, and residential areas. Christmas tree farms growing P. sylvestris, P. nigra, and P. ponderosa are also at high risk of infection. True epidemics of western gall rust are rare, occurring only in years when susceptible hosts, virulent pathogens, and proper environmental conditions are present simultaneously.

== Taxonomic history ==
The type collection of this species was made in May 1876 by H. W. Harkness and Justin P. Moore, found growing on a young ponderosa pine tree in the vicinity of Colfax, California. The finding was presented at a meeting of the San Francisco Microscopical Society in July 1876 in a talk by Harkness before the group, describing the natural history, taxonomic relationships, and pathogenic potential of this newly-discovered species of Peridermium. Justin P. Moore motioned that the fungus be named Peridermium Harknessii (Note: Species epithets within binomial names are always lowercased according to the modern rules of the International Code of Nomenclature for algae, fungi, and plants, even when the species epithet is derived from a normally capitalized proper noun like the name of a person or geographic location. However, the practices of biological nomenclature that were in effect in 19th Century routinely capitalized species epithets named for persons. The usage and spellings here reflects Moore's original designations for historical purposes rather than representing a valid name under current nomenclatural rules.) in honor of Dr. Harkness, and the vote of the society was unanimously in favor. Peridermium Harknessii was formally published in 1884 in an article by Harkness on new species of California fungi, but with authorship of the species name specifically attributed to Justin P. Moore so as to avoid the informal but strong prohibition in taxonomy for naming an organism's scientific name after oneself.

By the 1920s, it was known that other similar species of Peridermium were simply the aecial phase of Cronartium and that in keeping with the convention of dual nomenclature for many species of fungi that take different morphological forms through a complex life cycle, E. P. Meinecke proposed that the name of the gall-forming phase and of the organism overall should be Cronartium harknessii, while Peridermium harknessii should describe only the aecial phase of the life cycle.

In 1969, Yasuyuki Hiratsuka segregated C. harknessii and a few other species of Cronartium to the genus Endocronartium based on the fact that unlike other species of Cronartium, these species were thought to live their entire life cycle within a single host species rather than having to alternate hosts. There were objections to this classification scheme, notably that the rust species C. harknessii showed the strongest overall similarity to is C. quercuum, a species that obligately alternates between pine and oak species as hosts. In 2018, in keeping with the abandonment of dual nomenclature in fungi and with recognition of the close relationship of this species to C. quercuum and the artificiality of Endocronartium, Aime, et al recommended that the name Cronartium harknessii be revived as the preferred name of the taxon and that it should apply to all phases of the life cycle.

Later molecular phylogenetic studies of Cronartium have demonstrated that former Endocronartium species are within the Cronartium clade and do not form a distinct clade of their own. They have also demonstrated the very close relationship between the various host varieties of C. harknessii and those of C. quercuum, to the point where in 2022, Zhou, et al argued for treating Cronartium harknessii as conspecific with and a taxonomic synonym of Cronartium quercuum.

== Additional images ==
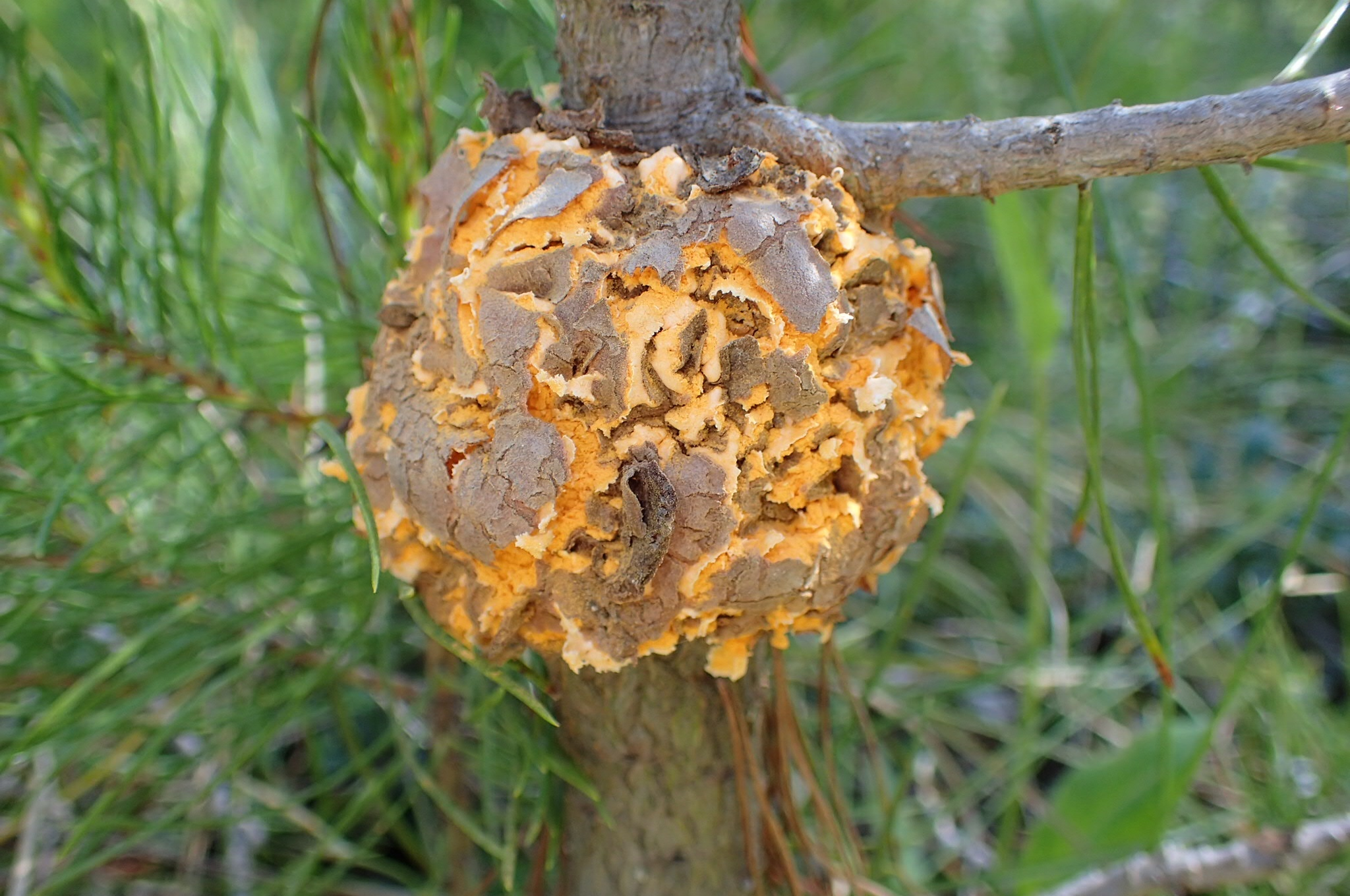
Missoula County, Montana, 2019

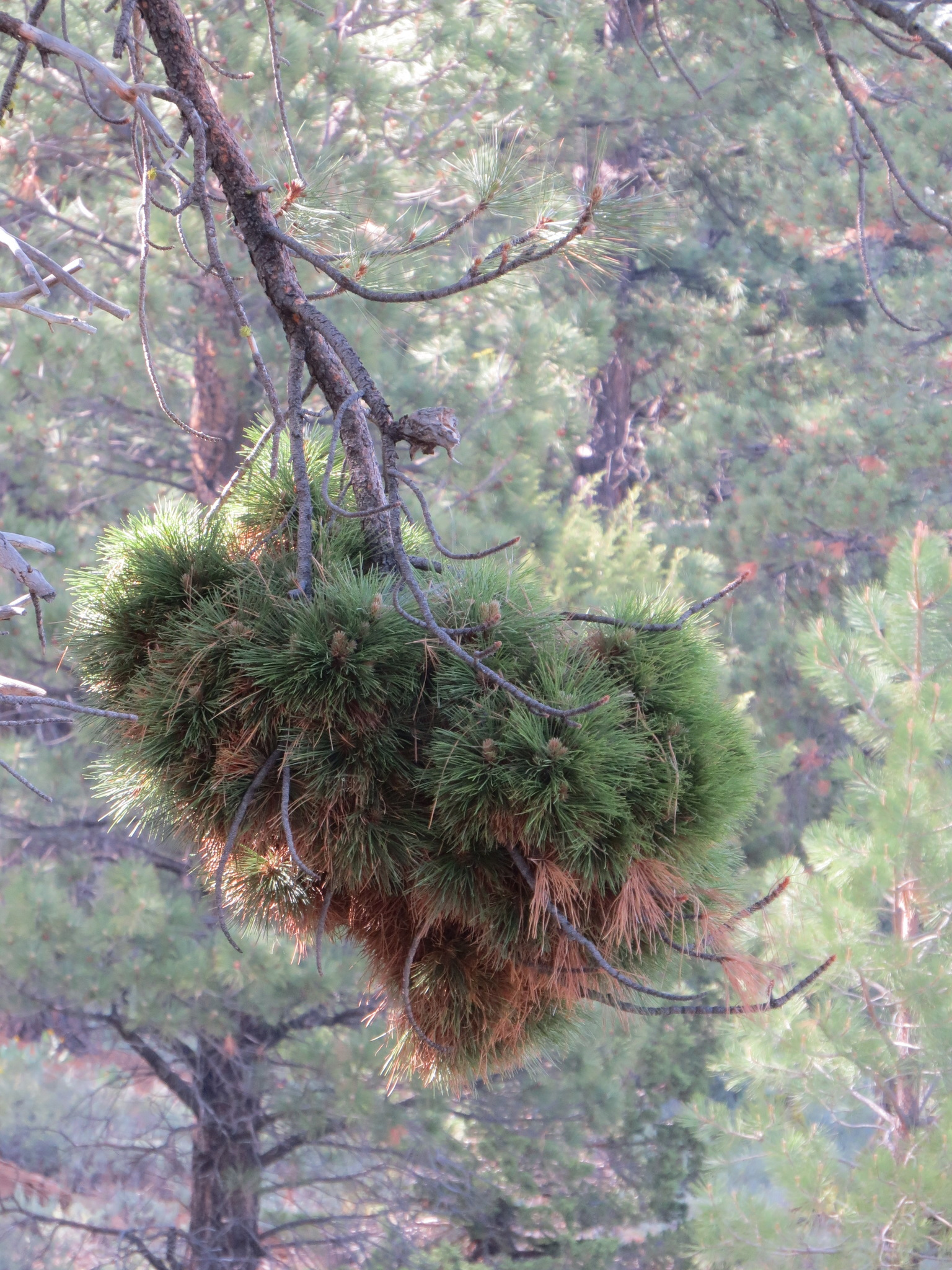
Sierra County, California, 2021

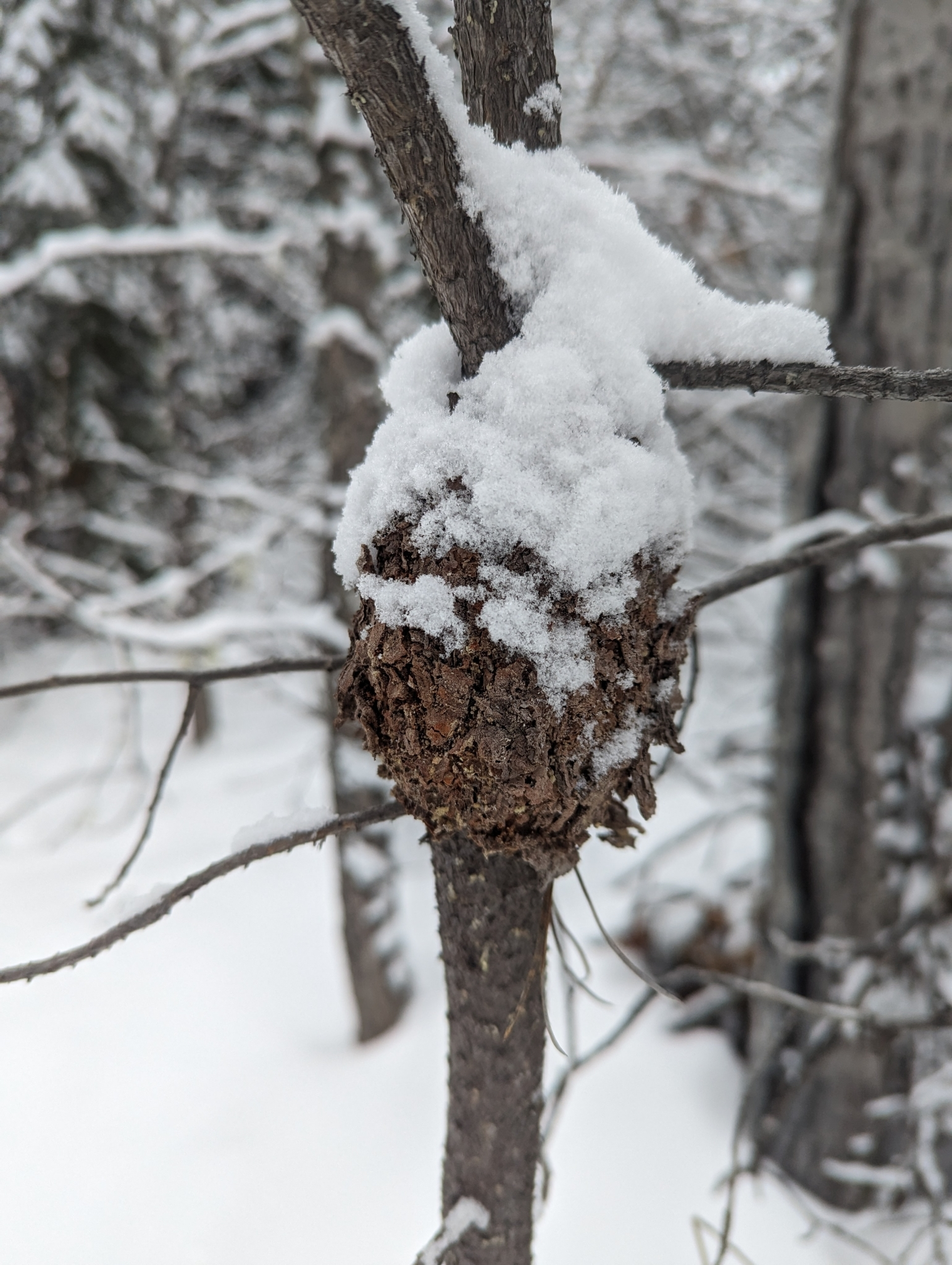
Jasper, Alberta, 2024

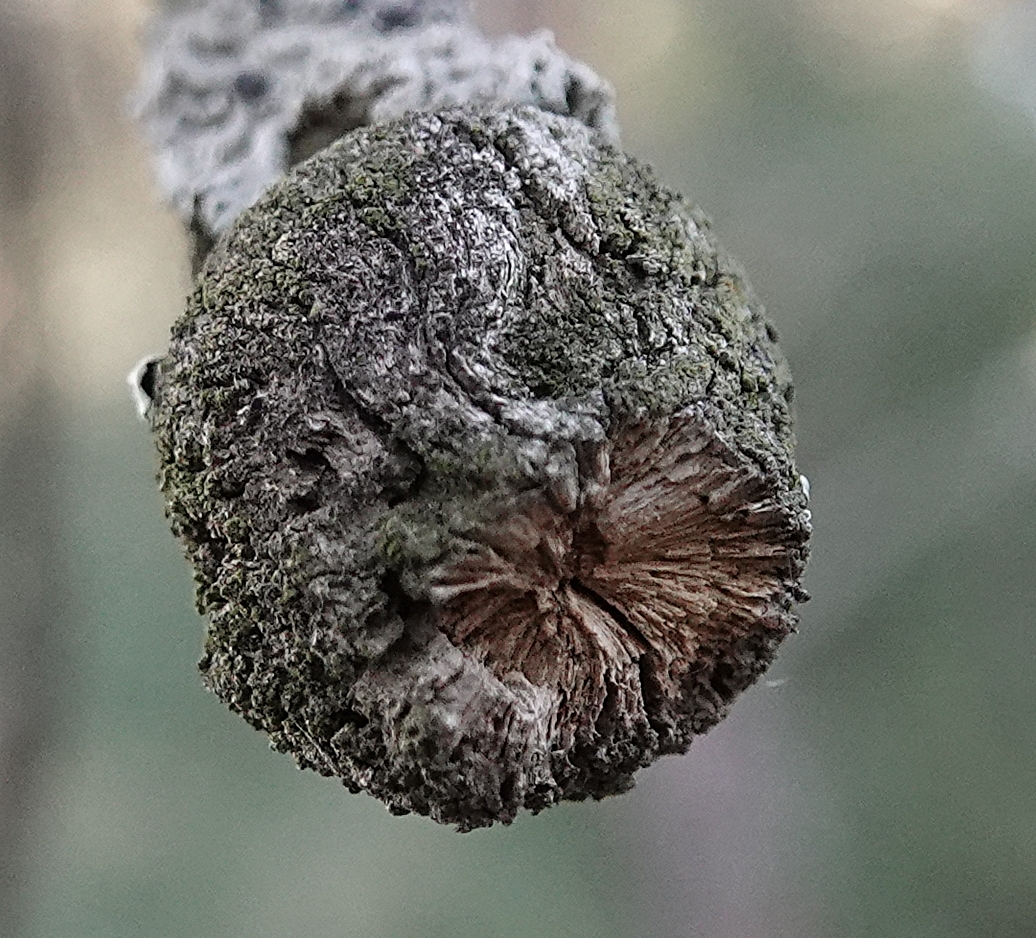
Scotts Bluff County, Nebraska, 2019
