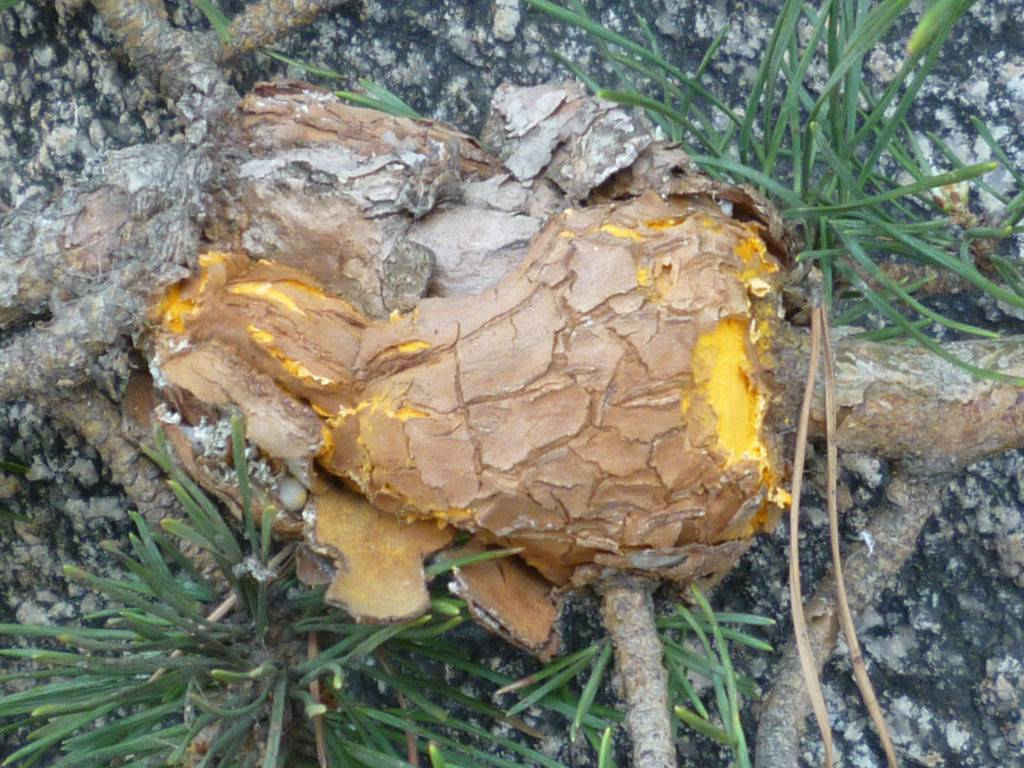
- Endocronartium harknessii

Scientific classification
- Kingdom: Fungi
- Division: Basidiomycota
- Class: Pucciniomycetes
- Order: Pucciniales
- Family: Cronartiaceae
- Genus: Endocronartium; Y.Hirats (1969)

Type species
- Endocronartium harknessii (J.P.Moore) Hirats. (1969)

Species
- E. harknessii E. pini E. sahoanum

= Endocronartium =

Genus of fungi

Endocronartium is a genus of rust fungi in the Cronartiaceae family. The genus contains three species found in Europe, North America, and Japan, that grow on Pinus trees. Endocronartium was circumscribed by Hiratsuka in 1969.

Endocronartium was found to be a taxonomic synonym for Cronartium in 2018, and species in that genus were renamed accordingly, in many cases reviving older names.
