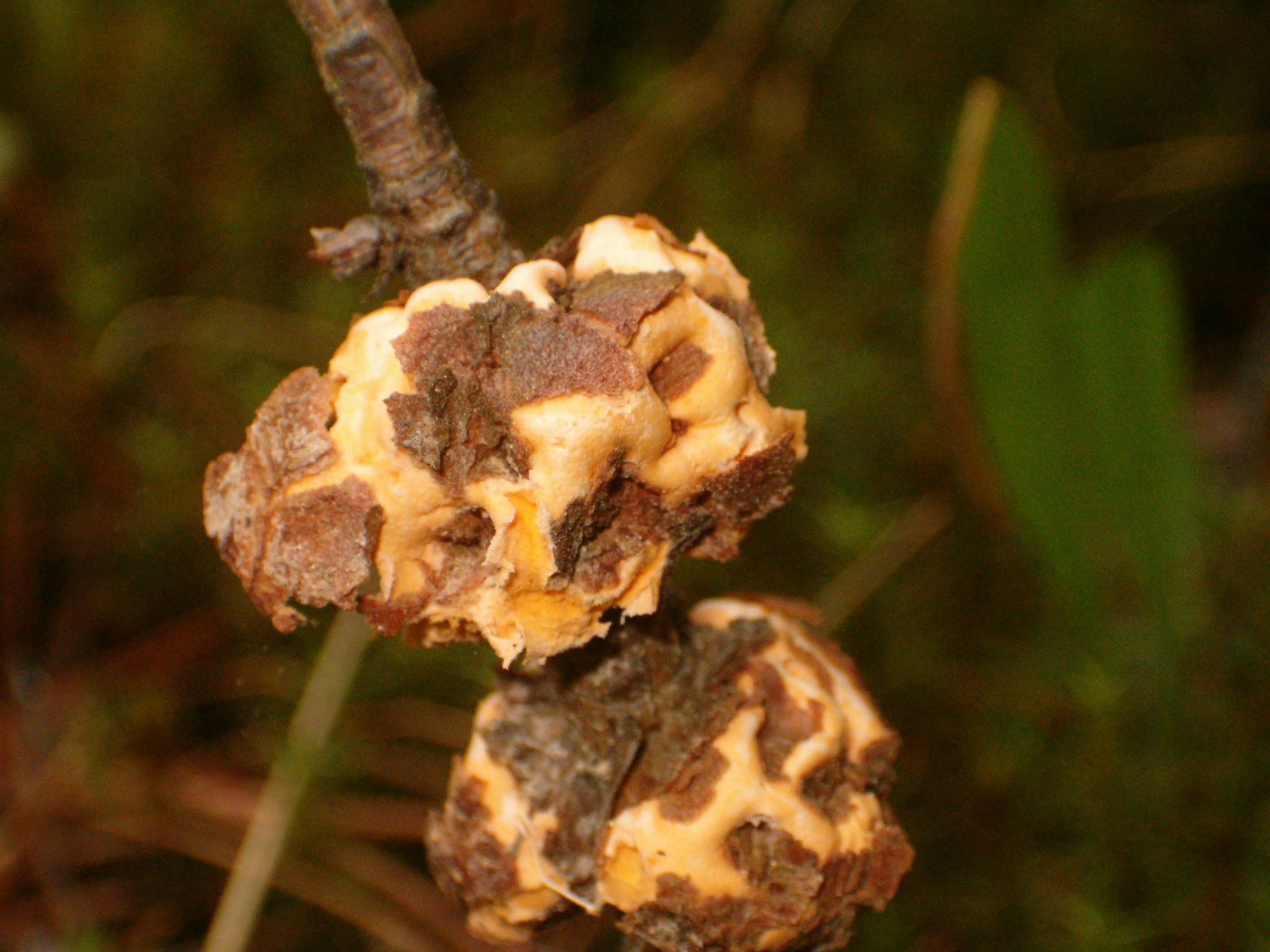
- Cronartium quercuum

Scientific classification
- Kingdom: Fungi
- Division: Basidiomycota
- Class: Pucciniomycetes
- Order: Pucciniales
- Family: Cronartiaceae
- Genus: Cronartium
- Species: C. quercuum

Binomial name
- Cronartium quercuum (Berk.) Miyabe ex Shirai

= Cronartium quercuum =

Fungal disease of pine and oak trees

Cronartium quercuum, also known as pine-oak gall rust, is a fungal disease of pine (Pinus spp.) and oak (Quercus spp.) trees. Similar to pine-pine gall rust, this disease is found on pine trees but its second host is an oak tree rather than another pine.

== Hosts and symptoms ==
The pathogen requires pine and oak trees to complete its life cycle. Aecial hosts in North America are two- and three-needled Pinus species. Pinus hosts include Austrian (P. nigra), Jack pine (P. banksiana), Mugo pine (P. mugo), Red pine (P. resinosa), Ponderosa pine (P. ponderosa), and Scots pine (P. sylvestris). Telial hosts are Quercus species. Quercus hosts are generally made up of the red oak group and include Northern pin oak (Q. ellipsoidalis), Bur oak (Q. macrocarpa), Pin oak (Q. palustris), and Northern red oak (Q. rubra).

Galls start to form as slight, rounded swelling on the tree stem, then grow to become spherical and elongate. Inside the galls are hyphae which occur in rays. Hyphae are typically found in the bark, as opposed to the wood. In the spring, aecia break through the bark covering the galls. Galls that form on branches of older pine trees cause only a little damage. Although infected seedlings could have severely stunted growth or even die off.

== Distribution ==
Cronartium quercuum is found throughout North, Central, and South America, the Caribbean, and Asia. In North America, C. quercuum is found in Canada, the United States, and Mexico. C. quercuum is typically found in the eastern United States, spreading as far west as the Great Lakes region. Within Asia, C. quercuum is found in China, India, Japan, the Republic of Korea, the Democratic People's Republic of Korea, and the Philippines.

== Life cycle ==
Pycnia and aecia are produced on pine host in the spring and early summer one to several years after infection. The aecia usually appear one year after the pycnia arise. Aeciospores move by wind to infect the telial host (Quercus). Because they move by wind, aeciospores are able to travel long distances to infect the telial host. The aeciospores are unable to re-infect pine species. Uredinia form on the oak species 1–3 weeks after infection, telia develop about 15 days later. Teliospores germinate and produce basidiospores. Basidiospores are also wind-dispersed and travel to infect first-year pine needles. The telial host can't be re-infected by basidiospores. Basidiospore infection occurs in summer and fall. The life cycle is complete when Pinus is infected by basidiospores.

== Management ==
Management of pine-oak gall rust is fairly simple and straightforward. Prune out galls to reduce spreading of spores to nearby pine or oak trees. Prune galls from pine branches in the late winter or early spring.
