= Neanthes =

Neanthes may refer to:

- Neanthes (annelid), a genus of polychaetes in the family Nereididae
- Neanthes, a genus of beetles in the family Cerambycidae; synonym of Acalolepta
- Neanthes of Cyzicus, Ancient Greek writer
