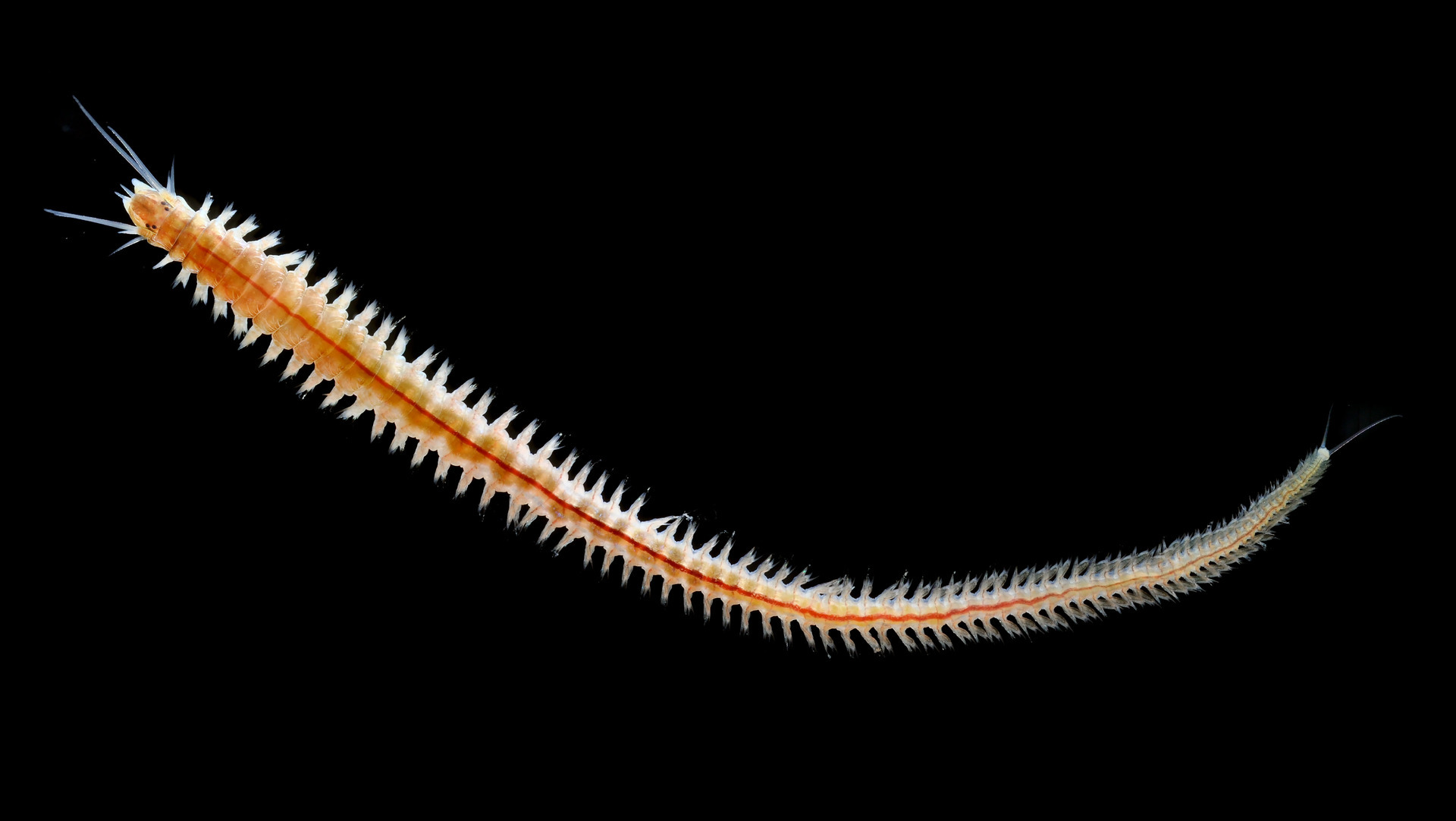

Scientific classification
- Kingdom: Animalia
- Phylum: Annelida
- Clade: Pleistoannelida
- Subclass: Errantia
- Order: Phyllodocida
- Family: Nereididae
- Genus: Neanthes
- Species: N. arenaceodentata

Binomial name
- Neanthes arenaceodentata (Moore, 1903)

Synonyms
- Nereis arenaceodentata Moore, 1903

= Neanthes arenaceodentata =

Marine worm

Neanthes arenaceodentata is a species of marine polychaete worm in the family Nereididae. It occurs in shallow waters in the tropical Atlantic and Pacific Oceans. It has been used in the laboratory in testing the toxicity of marine sediments.

== Taxonomy ==
This worm was first described in 1903 by the American naturalist Justin P. Moore who gave it the name Nereis arenaceodentata. At one time referred to as Nereis (Neanthes) arenaceodentata, Neanthes was later raised to full genus level, making this worm Neanthes arenaceodentata. Research suggests that the populations to the east and west of North America, which are reproductively isolated, may be two separate species. The genus name is from the Greek Νεάνθης "new-blooming", while the specific name is from Latin arēnāceō + dentāta, "sandy-toothed."

== Distribution and habitat ==
Neanthes arenaceodentata is found in the tropical Pacific and Atlantic Oceans and the Caribbean Sea. It occurs in the sediment on the seabed in shallow seas and estuaries.

== Biology ==
This worm creates a tube in the sediment in which it lives. As they become sexually mature, a male and female worm pair up and share a single tube. Eggs are laid and fertilised inside the tube and the female plays no further part in their rearing. The male remains in the tube to incubate the eggs, creating a current of water with undulations of his body to oxygenate the eggs and remove waste matter. The larvae undergo direct development in the tube, leaving as juvenile worms after about three weeks to build their own tubes. The whole life cycle takes from 12 to 16 weeks.

Neanthes arenaceodentata is a sub-surface deposit-feeder, ingesting sedimentary particles up to 70μm in diameter. It has been used as a test organism to evaluate the toxicity of marine sediments. A protocol has been prepared for a 28-day sublethal bioassay using the worm which can assess sediment quality and evaluate dredged materials for regulatory purposes.
