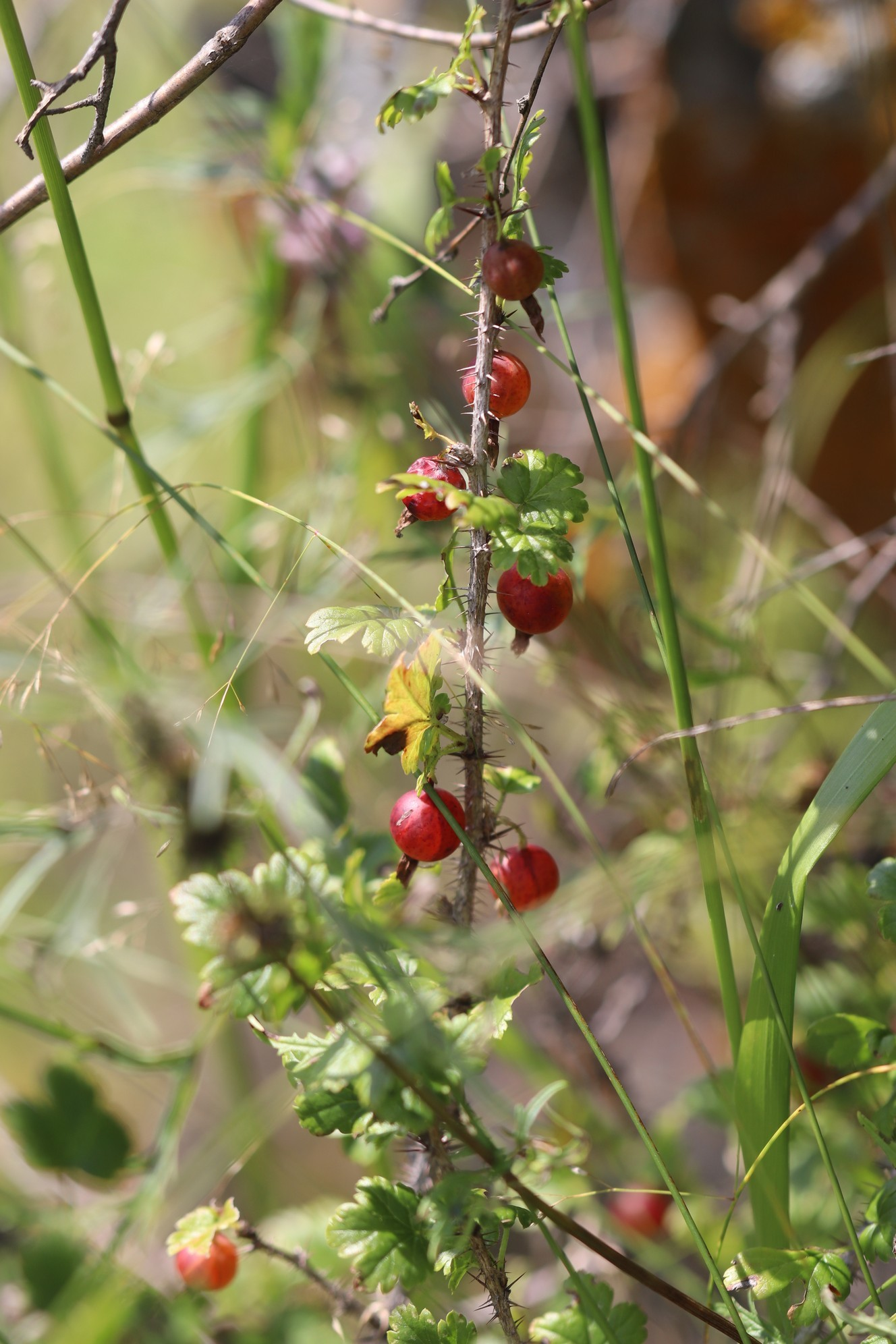

Scientific classification
- Kingdom: Plantae
- Clade: Tracheophytes
- Clade: Angiosperms
- Clade: Eudicots
- Order: Saxifragales
- Family: Grossulariaceae
- Genus: Ribes
- Species: R. aciculare

Binomial name
- Ribes aciculare Sm.

Synonyms
- Grossularia acicularis (Sm.) Spach

= Ribes aciculare =

Species of flowering plant

Ribes aciculare is a species of flowering plant in the currant/gooseberry family Grossulariacea, generally regarded as closely related to Ribes burejense. It is native to central and northern Asia, and has been reported as native to Altay, Kazakhstan, Krasnoyarsk, Mongolia, Tuva, West Siberia, Xinjiang. Its habitats vary from stony hill and mountain slopes to forest margins and thickets. In Northern China it has been found at altitudes of 1,500-2,100 metres. The plant is very cold hardy, and can tolerate temperatures down to -20°C during dormancy (typically the winter months).

The plant typically forms a deciduous shrub of about 1 metre or somewhat more. The shrub's branchlets are glabrous, with 3-7 spines forming at branchlet nodes. It generally grows in semi-shade (light woodland) or without shade, and can survive in light (sandy), medium (loamy) and heavy (clay) soils, which can be acid, neutral or basic (alkaline). It does best in moist but well-drained soil, and tends to set more fruit if unshaded.

Flowering takes place from May to June. The plant is hermaphrodite and the flowers are pollinated by insects. The fruits ripen from July to August, taking the form of red globes of up to 15mm in diameter, similar to other species in its genus. The fruit is edible, both raw and cooked; it is sweet and pleasant-tasting. The fruit is harvested from wild plants for local use, and is sometimes cultivated as a fruit crop in parts of Russia. Where cultivated there are some named varieties, some of which may be crosses with the gooseberry (Ribes uva-crispa).

Like other Ribes species, R. aciculare is particularly susceptible to honey fungus. The plant can also become infected with white pine blister rust (Cronartium ribicola)), a rust fungus whose heteroecious life cycle requires it to infect a Ribes plant as an obligate secondary host.
