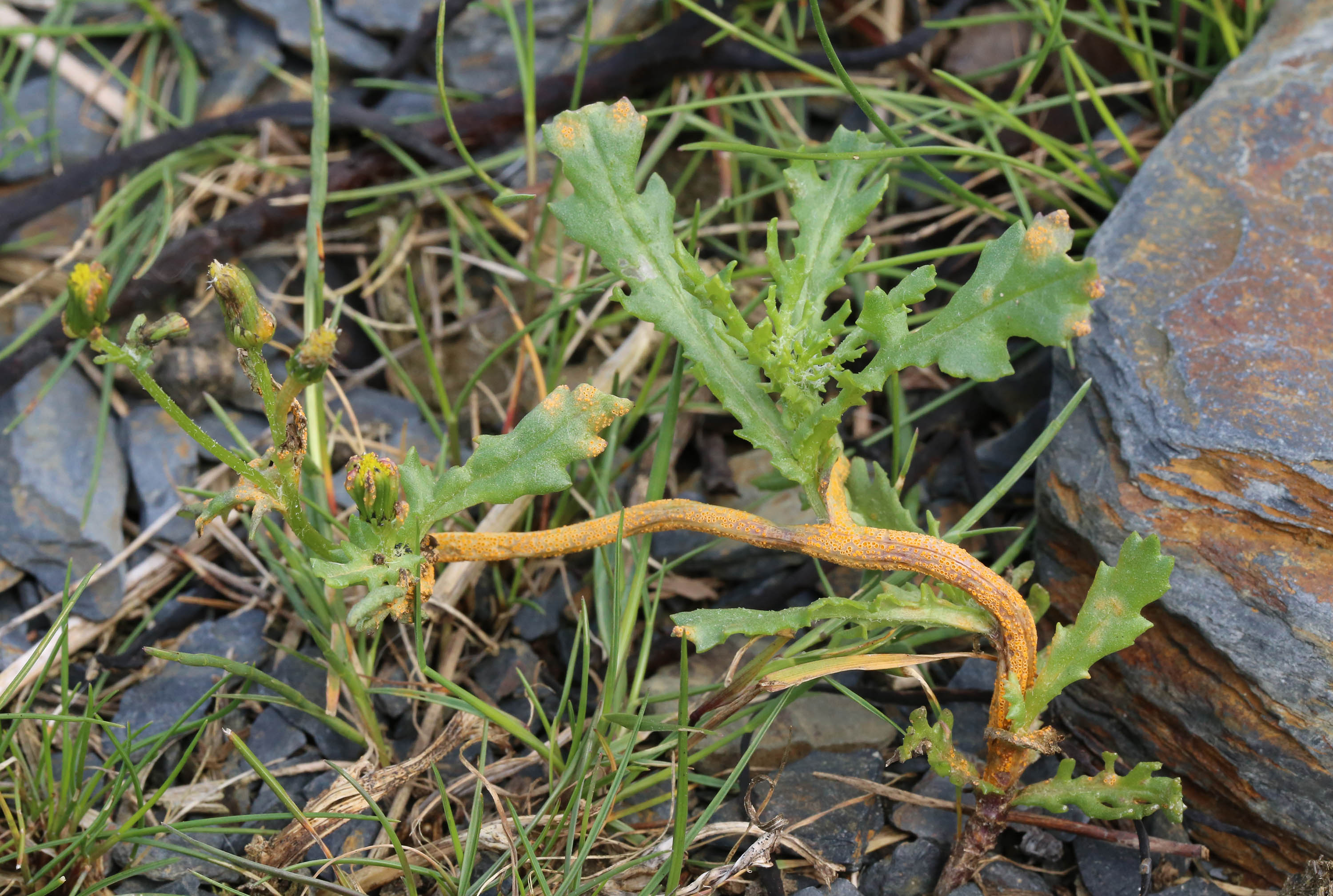
- Puccinia lagenophorae on Senecio vulgaris.

Scientific classification
- Domain: Eukaryota
- Kingdom: Fungi
- Division: Basidiomycota
- Class: Pucciniomycetes
- Order: Pucciniales
- Family: Pucciniaceae
- Genus: Puccinia
- Species: P. lagenophorae

Binomial name
- Puccinia lagenophorae Cooke, 1884

Synonyms
- Puccinia terrieriana Mayor, 1962

= Puccinia lagenophorae =

Rust fungus

Puccinia lagenophorae is a rust fungus which infects plants in the family Asteraceae, particularly Senecio squalidus and Senecio vulgaris. It is native to Australia, and was first found in Europe in 1961.

It produces aecia and telia on its hosts.
