= Peridermium californicum =

Scientific classification
- Kingdom: Fungi
- Division: Basidiomycota
- Class: Pucciniomycetes
- Order: Pucciniales
- Family: Cronartiaceae
- Genus: Peridermium
- Species: P. californicum

Binomial name
- Peridermium californicum Arthur & F. Kern, (1914)

Species of fungus

Peridermium californicum is a fungal plant pathogen infecting sunflowers.
