= Blackcurrant production in the United States =

Agricultural production

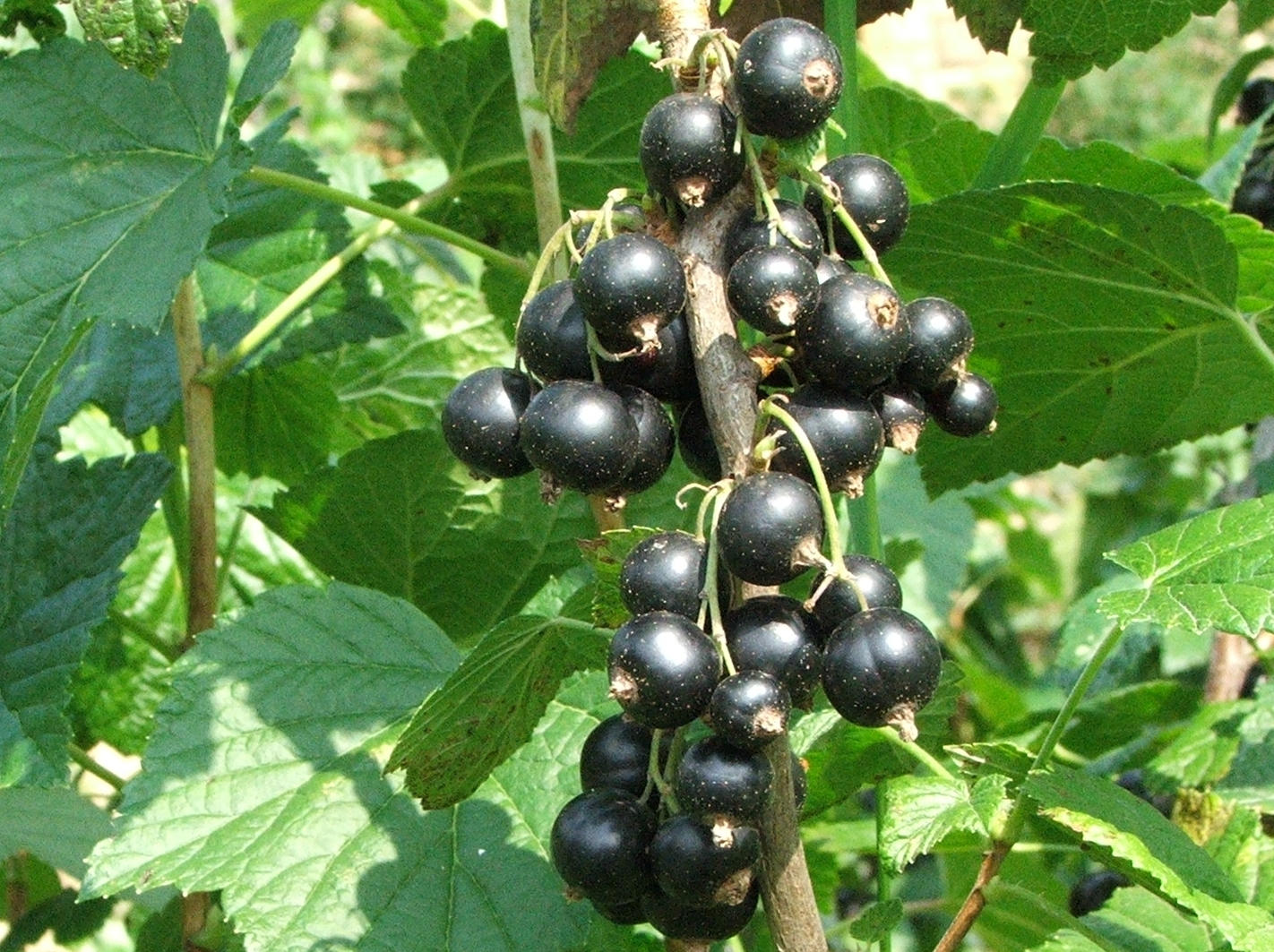
Blackcurrant fruit

Blackcurrant production in the United States is relatively limited. The blackcurrant (Ribes nigrum) was introduced by English settlers at the Massachusetts Bay Colony in 1629 and was cultivated on some scale, particularly in New York. The plant acts as a host for the white pine blister rust that threatened the timber industry. In 1911, the federal government banned the cultivation, sale, and transport of blackcurrants to protect the white pine. Government programs systematically destroyed blackcurrant plants by chemical spraying.

The federal ban was lifted in 1966, though many states maintained their own bans. Research showed that blackcurrants could be safely grown some distance from white pines and this, together with the development of rust-immune varieties and new fungicides, led to most states lifting their bans by 2003. Blackcurrants are now grown commercially in the Northeastern United States and the Pacific Northwest. Because of the long period of restrictions, blackcurrants are not popular in the United States, and one researcher has estimated that only 0.1% of Americans have eaten one.

== History ==
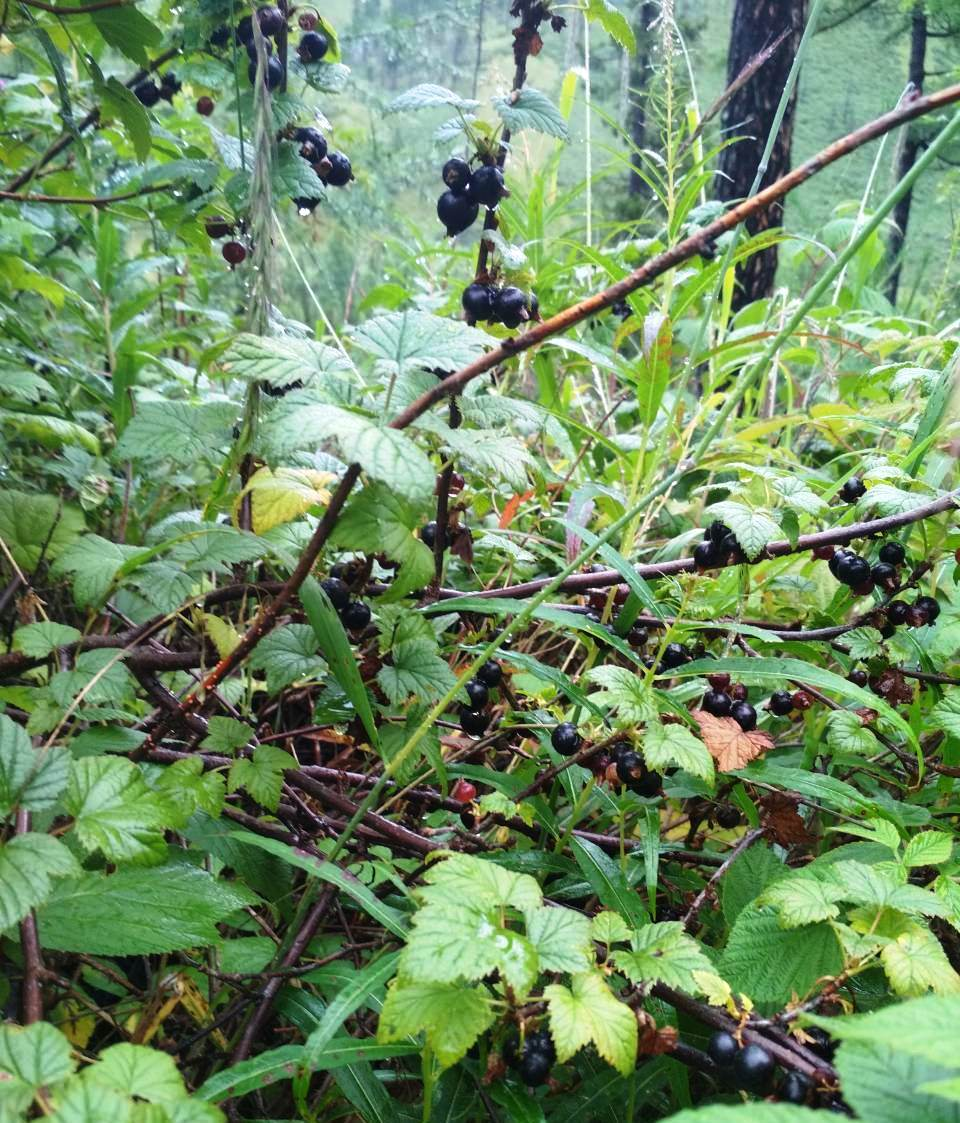
A wild blackcurrant

The blackcurrant (Ribes nigrum) is a woody deciduous shrub native to Europe and part of the genus Ribes, together with other currants (e.g. red and white currants) and the gooseberry. Its stiff upright branches ("canes") bear flowers and small, black berries. The plant was introduced to North America by English settlers at the Massachusetts Bay Colony from 1629 and by the late 19th century there were some 7,400 acres (3,000 hectares) of Ribes in cultivation. New York was a center of Ribes production, accounting for 3,300,000 US dry quarts (3,600,000 L) of fruit production out of 7,600,000 US dry quarts (8,400,000 L) nationwide. The blackcurrant was not widely popular, being eclipsed by the red and white currants, and in 1925 their taste was described in The Small Fruits of New York as "a stinking and somewhat loathing savour".

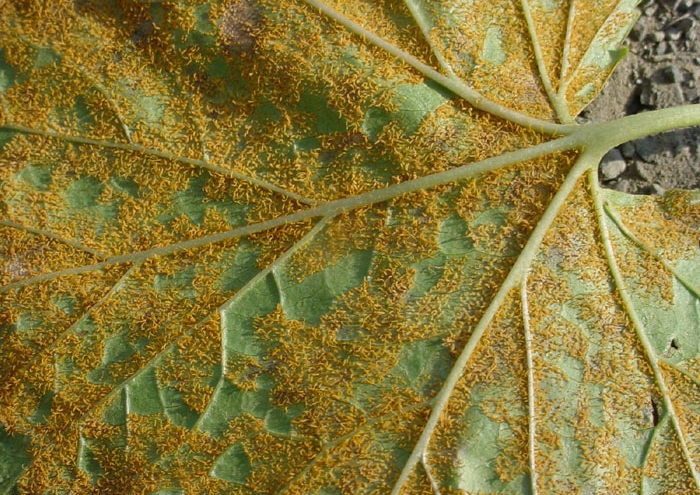
White pine blister rust on a Ribes plant

The blackcurrant, in common with other Ribes, is a telial (secondary) host of the white pine blister rust (Cronartium ribicola). The aecial (primary) hosts of the rust are the five-needle pines, including the eastern white pine (Pinus strobus). The Ribes are largely unaffected by the rust but it significantly affects the growth of, and can kill, pines. The blackcurrant, of all the Ribes species, is particularly susceptible to the rust.

In the early 1900s there were few fungicides available to treat the rust, which threatened the American lumber industry. In response to concerns the federal government banned the cultivation, sale and transport of blackcurrants in 1911 and funded a program of eradication by chemical spraying, later often carried out by members of the Civilian Conservation Corps.

The scientific advice changed over the following decades and it is now believed that the white pine is affected by the rust only where blackcurrants are grown in close proximity in moist conditions. The federal ban on cultivation was lifted in 1966, with the individual states left to decide on management of the blackcurrant. Varieties of blackcurrant immune to white pine rust became available in the 1970s. Some of these were grown commercially in New York and were tolerated by conservation officials, though they were still legally banned. The ban in New York was lifted in mid-2002 after a campaign by a farmer who wanted to expand cultivation of the fruit. Though the white pine is now rarely used for lumber, the relaxation of the ban led to protests by some in the forestry industry.

== Current restrictions ==
By 2003 restrictions on Ribes cultivation had been lifted across most of the states, though some bans remain, particularly on the blackcurrant. State laws are enforced with varying degrees of efficiency and enthusiasm; in some states, officials effectively ignore the ban.

Nationally, a prohibition on the import of blackcurrant plants from Northern Ireland, the Isle of Man, the Channel Islands and several EU countries remains. A special permit is required to import it from Chile.

== Current cultivation and use ==
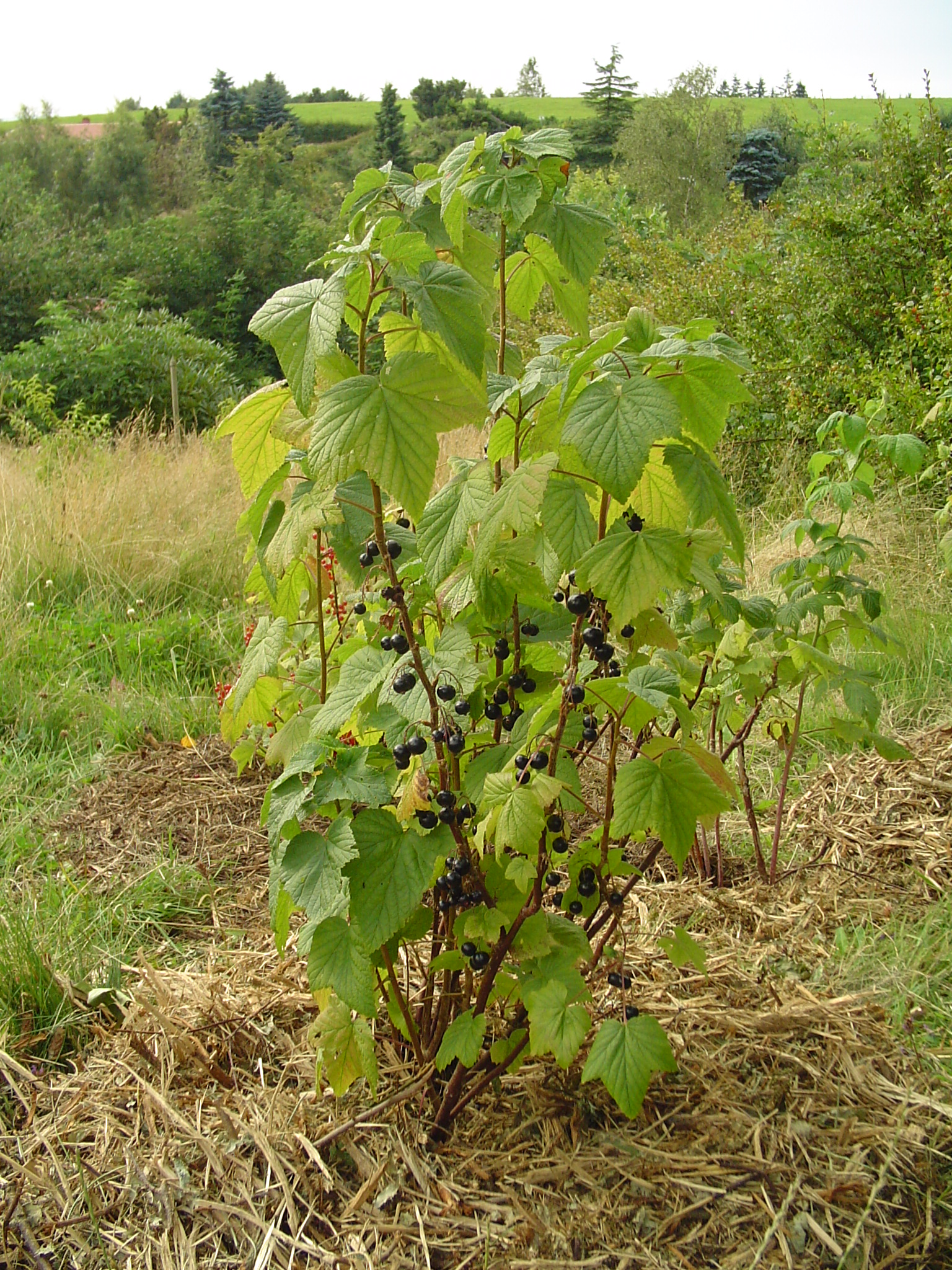
A cultivated blackcurrant

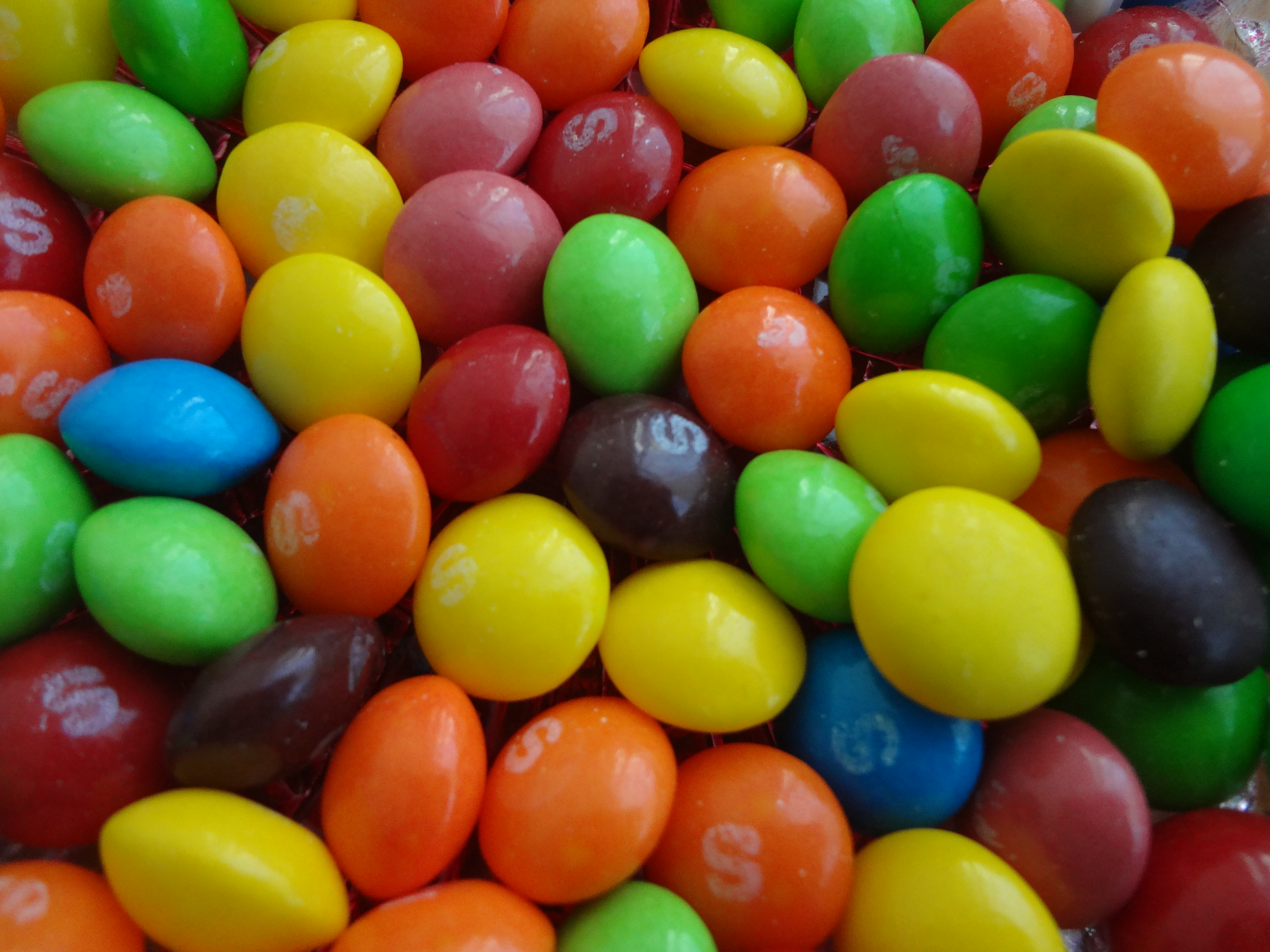
Purple Skittles are blackcurrant flavored in the United Kingdom

The cultivation of Ribes was adversely affected by the long period of restrictions and current agricultural use is hampered by the remaining bans. The plant was rarely seen in the United States outside of bushes in back yards until the national ban was lifted; by 2019 it was grown commercially in the Northeastern United States and the Pacific Northwest. The United States Department of Agriculture does not keep records of commercial blackcurrant production but lists them as an introduced species in the following areas:

- Connecticut: Fairfield, Hartford and New London Counties
- Illinois: Lake County
- Maine: Knox, Penobscot and Somerset Counties
- Maryland: whole state
- Massachusetts: Essex, Hampshire, Middlesex, Norfolk and Plymouth Counties
- Michigan: Houghton and Washtenaw Counties
- Minnesota: Kandiyohi, Lake, Ramsey and St. Louis Counties.
- New Hampshire: Coös and Strafford Counties
- New Jersey: Bergen, Sussex and Union Counties
- New York: Cattaraugus, Chenango, Columbia, Erie, Franklin, Fulton, Nassau, Oswego and Rensselaer Counties
- Ohio: whole state
- Oregon: Wallowa County
- Wisconsin: Brown, Dane and Waupaca Counties

The fruit is not used widely in the United States, except for the liqueur crème de cassis. This is because of the difficulty in obtaining the fruit during its period of restriction. Danny L. Barney, a professor of horticulture at the University of Idaho, said in 2009: "People simply forgot about them ... there's ignorance about what they are, and there are so many fruits available from all over the world at the supermarket". Marvin Pritts, a professor of horticulture at Cornell University, asserts that less than 0.1% of Americans have likely ever eaten a blackcurrant.

Their rarity in the United States contrasts with the situation in Europe, which produces 99.1% of the world's blackcurrant crop, and where blackcurrant is a popular flavor of squash (cordial). Two thirds of European blackcurrant production is destined for the squash industry. In the United Kingdom, where blackcurrant squash gained popularity during World War II as a source of vitamin C, the situation is even more pronounced – 90% of all British blackcurrant production is sold to the Ribena company. There were few commercial pine tree plantations in Europe and the blackcurrant was a historically important crop; Ribes has never been banned in European states. Because of the effects of the ban, purple Skittles are grape-flavored in the United States, whereas they are blackcurrant-flavored in the United Kingdom and some European countries.
