= Justin Moore (disambiguation) =

Justin Moore (born 1984) is an American country musician.

Justin Moore may also refer to:

- Justin Moore (album), his self-titled debut album
- Justin Moore (soccer) (born 1983), American soccer player
- Justin Moore (basketball) (born 2000), American basketball player
- Justin P. Moore (1841–1923), American mycologist
- Justin T. Moore (born 1974), set theorist and logician
