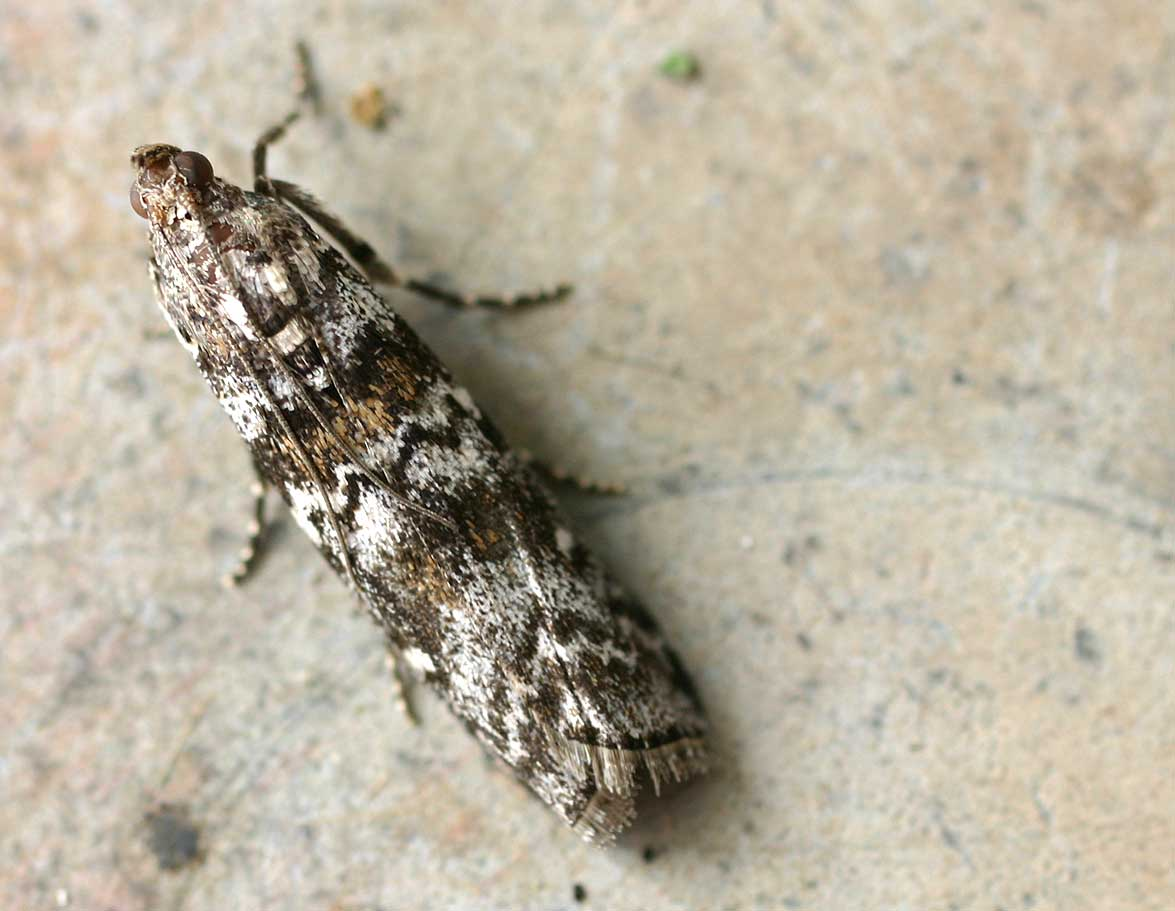

Scientific classification
- Domain: Eukaryota
- Kingdom: Animalia
- Phylum: Arthropoda
- Class: Insecta
- Order: Lepidoptera
- Family: Pyralidae
- Genus: Dioryctria
- Species: D. sylvestrella

Binomial name
- Dioryctria sylvestrella Ratzeburg, 1840

Synonyms
- Phycis sylvestrella Ratzeburg, 1840; Nephopteryx splendidella Herrich-Schäffer, 1848; Dioryctria splendidella

= Dioryctria sylvestrella =

Species of moth

Dioryctria sylvestrella, the new pine knot-horn or maritime pine borer, is a moth of the family Pyralidae. It is found in Europe, parts of Asia and North Africa. The adult is a small mottled brown and white insect with a wingspan of 28 to 35 mm (1.1 to 1.4 in). The moth flies in a single generation from June to October and is a pest of maritime pine and several other species of pine, on which the caterpillars feed.

== Description ==
Moths in the genus Dioryctria generally have forewings that are dark greyish-brown to black, with various white markings, chevrons and zigzag lines. Dioryctria sylvestrella has a wingspan of 28 to 35 mm (1.1 to 1.4 in) and is very similar in appearance to related species. This moth was first detected in Britain in 2001, and can be told from the three other species in the genus already there by the fact that the "subterminal line is generally smooth with a single waved kink [at] its mid-point, in the other three species this line is dentate from the mid-point to the dorsum".

== Distribution and hosts ==
Dioryctria sylvestrella occurs naturally in Europe, much of Asia and North Africa. It occurs as far north as the Arctic Circle but is more common at lower latitudes, and this is where it does most damage. In Europe, it mainly infests the maritime pine (Pinus pinaster) but it can feed on other species of pine, and on spruce. Other known hosts are P. caribaea, P. halepensis, P. kesiya, P. merkusii, P. nigra and P. pinea. New shoots on trees that have been treated with fertiliser are more likely to be infested than unfertilised trees, and pruned trees are also targeted over non-pruned trees.

== Life cycle ==
The adult moths are on the wing in southern Europe from about July to September. The female chooses fast-growing, vigorous host trees on which to lay its eggs. The larvae attack buds, shoots, cones, and young stems. Damaged tissue or sites attacked by the rust fungus Endocronartium allow the larvae to enter the tissues and tunnel under the bark into the phloem. The larvae usually stay near where they hatched, but occasionally migrate to other parts of the tree. They pupate inside the mass of resin mixed with frass which they produce.

== Damage ==
The larvae of this moth are one of the main pests of maritime pine, an important plantation crop of the Mediterranean region where it is grown for timber and resin production as well as dune stabilisation. Their boring activity causes large quantities of resin to flow from the wounds which weakens the tree and allows fungi and other pathogens to gain entry.
