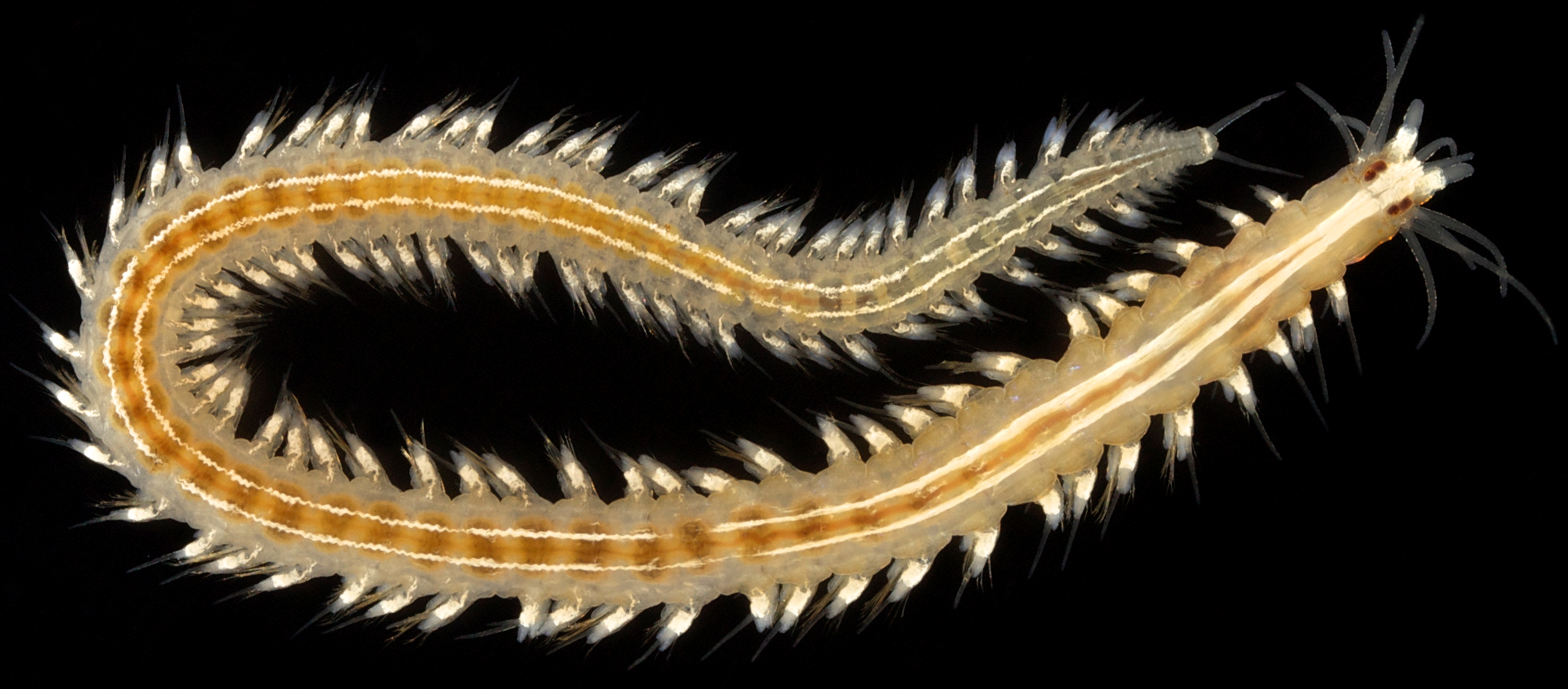

Scientific classification
- Kingdom: Animalia
- Phylum: Annelida
- Clade: Pleistoannelida
- Subclass: Errantia
- Order: Phyllodocida
- Family: Nereididae
- Genus: Neanthes
- Species: N. fucata

Binomial name
- Neanthes fucata (Savigny, 1822)

Synonyms
- Lycoris fucata Savigny, 1822; Nereis bilineata Johnston, 1839; Nereis buccinicola Leach in Johnston, 1865; Nereis fucata (Savigny, 1822)

= Neanthes fucata =

Species of annelid worm

Neanthes fucata is a species of marine polychaete worm in the family Nereididae. It lives in association with a hermit crab such as Pagurus bernhardus. It occurs in the northeastern Atlantic Ocean, the North Sea and the Mediterranean Sea.

== Taxonomy ==
This worm was first described in 1822 by the French zoologist Marie Jules César Savigny, who gave it the name Nereis fucata, however it was later transferred to the genus Neanthes, making it Neanthes fucata.

== Description ==
The body of this segmented worm is long, slender and tapering, with a smooth cuticle. The prostomium bears a pair of antennae, a pair of palps and two pairs of eyes. The first body segment is twice as long as the rest and bears the pharynx and four pairs of tentacular cirri. Segments two and three have uniramous parapodia (unbranched lateral lobes bearing bristles) while the remaining segments bear biramous (two-lobed) parapodia. This worm is yellowish, with longitudinal stripes in red and white. A worm of 120 segments measures about 200 mm (8 in).

== Distribution and habitat ==
This worm is native to the northwestern Atlantic Ocean, the Kattegat, the North Sea, the English Channel, the Mediterranean Sea and the Black Sea. It lives in association with a hermit crab, sharing the shell of the gastropod mollusc in which it lives, but individuals have occasionally been observed away from a host, probably only temporarily. Over much of its range, the normal host is the common European species Pagurus bernhardus which is found on the mid and lower shore and at depths down to about 140 m (460 ft).

== Ecology ==
Neanthes fucata lives inside an empty gastropod mollusc shell inhabited by a hermit crab. It is able to steal scraps of food from the hermit crab by protruding its pharynx between the crab's third maxillipeds. It has been shown that the crab recognises its commensal worm and does not attack it. A single adult worm inhabits a single host mollusc shell occupied by a hermit crab, but occasionally a single adult and several juveniles have been found living together. The adult worms show territorial behaviour, fighting with other worms of the same species. However the worms are gonochoristic and there must be some mechanism by which a male and female come into close proximity during the period in which they are reproductively active. Some possibilities for this to happen include the hosts being close together, temporary aggregations of individual worms during the breeding season, or by the release of gametes into the sea water.
