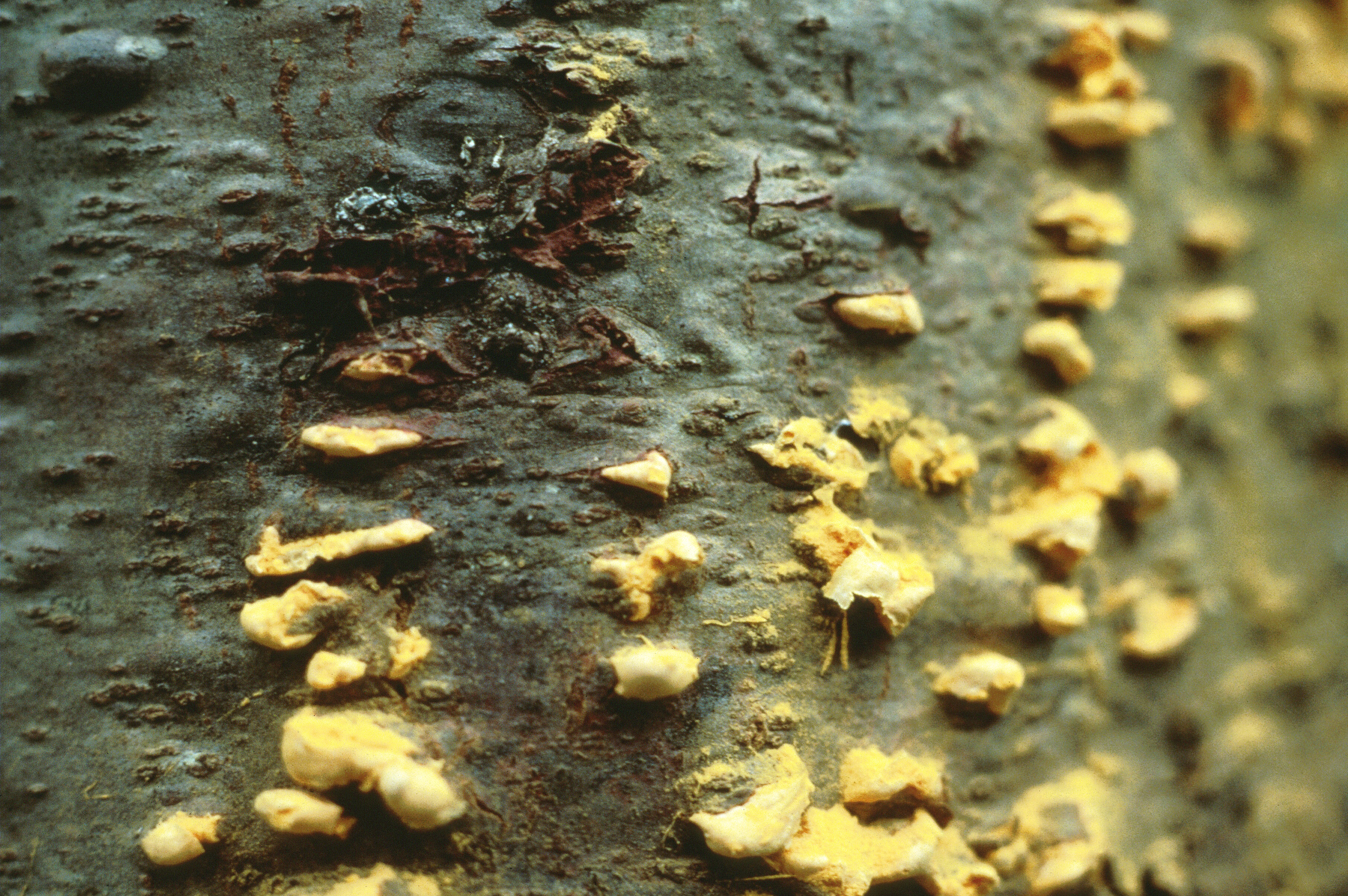
- Cronartium ribicola on western white pine

Scientific classification
- Kingdom: Fungi
- Division: Basidiomycota
- Class: Pucciniomycetes
- Order: Pucciniales
- Family: Cronartiaceae
- Genus: Cronartium
- Species: C. ribicola

Binomial name
- Cronartium ribicola J.C.Fisch.
- Distribution of Cronartium ribicola

Synonyms
- White pine blister rust Currant rust

= Cronartium ribicola =

Species of rust fungus

Cronartium ribicola is a species of rust fungus in the family Cronartiaceae that causes the disease white pine blister rust. Other names include: Rouille vésiculeuse du pin blanc (French), white pine Blasenrost (German), moho ampolla del pino blanco (Spanish).

== Origin ==
Cronartium ribicola is native to China, and was introduced to North America. The rust was first discovered on currants in Geneva, New York in 1906. It was first seen on imported white pine seedlings from European nurseries in 1909. Some European and Asian white pines (e.g. Macedonian pine, Swiss pine and blue pine) are mostly resistant to the disease, having co-evolved with the pathogen.

== Invasive species ==
It was accidentally introduced into North America in approximately 1900, where it is an invasive species causing serious damage to the American white pines, which have little genetic resistance. Mortality is particularly heavy in western white pine, sugar pine, limber pine and whitebark pine. Efforts are under way to select and breed the rare resistant individuals of these species; resistance breeding is concentrated at the United States Forest Service Dorena Genetic Resource Center in Oregon and the Moscow Forestry Services Laboratory in Idaho.

== Silviculture ==
Some limited silvicultural control of the disease is possible.

=== Pruning ===
If bark blisters are found on branches over 10–15 cm from the trunk, those branches may be pruned off, which will stop the spread of the disease to the rest of that tree. If the main trunk is affected then no control is possible, and the tree will die once the infection encircles the tree.

=== Flagging ===
Infected trees are often identified by "flagging", when all the needles on a branch turn brown and die. Infections often occur on low branches close to the ground on young trees, so pruning of white pine can also be effective in multiple ways, as it improves the quality of timber by creating more knot-free timber, and reduces the likelihood of infection from the blister rust to a small extent.

=== Banning of black currants ===
Another form of control practiced in some areas is to diligently remove Ribes plants from any area near white pines, including the blackcurrant. Because the infection moves from currant plants, to pines, and back again, it cannot continue to exist without its secondary (telial) host. Although effective in theory, removal of currants is rarely successful in practice, as they readily re-grow from small pieces of root left in the soil, and the seeds are very widely spread in birds' droppings. According to the Southwest Oregon Forest Insect and Disease Service Center, white pine blister rust attacks all five-needle pines. "Damage [to plants] includes mortality, top kill, branch dieback, and predisposition to attack by other agents, including bark beetles."

== Disease cycle ==
Cronartium ribicola has two obligate hosts: Pinus spp and Ribes spp. Five-needle pines (Pinus spp.) are infected in the fall by basidiospores that have spread under cool, moist conditions from the alternate host, currants and gooseberries (Ribes spp.), and germinated on needles to enter with germ tubes through open stomata. Young pines are most susceptible and will die at faster rates following infection. A mycelial network then spreads through the needle and into intercellular space in the inner bark, resulting in the formation of a blister rust canker. Spermagonia are produced at the margins on the canker and give rise to spermatia in the following spring. Once spermatia have fertilized receptive hyphae in the Pinus spp. host, aecia are formed within a year, appearing as white blisters before rupture reveals the orange or yellow aeciospores within. The wind-blown aeciospores infect Ribes spp. and the fungus quickly develops uredia in less than a few weeks. Uredospores produced in this stage spread to infect other parts of the same host or other Ribes spp. hosts in the area. Next, telia are developed on the abaxial (lower) surface of leaves, where teliospores germinate to give rise to basidiospores that will complete the disease cycle by infecting Pinus spp. hosts.

== Hosts and symptoms ==
As is common among rusts, the life cycle of Cronartium ribicola includes two host species and goes through five spore stages. This life cycle is termed heteroecious. In the specific case of Cronartium ribicola, the aecial host of this pathogen is the white pine (Pinus subgenus Strobus, family Pinaceae) and the telial hosts are those of the genus Ribes, specifically currants and gooseberries. Species of both telial and aecial hosts have varying levels of resistance or immunity to infection.

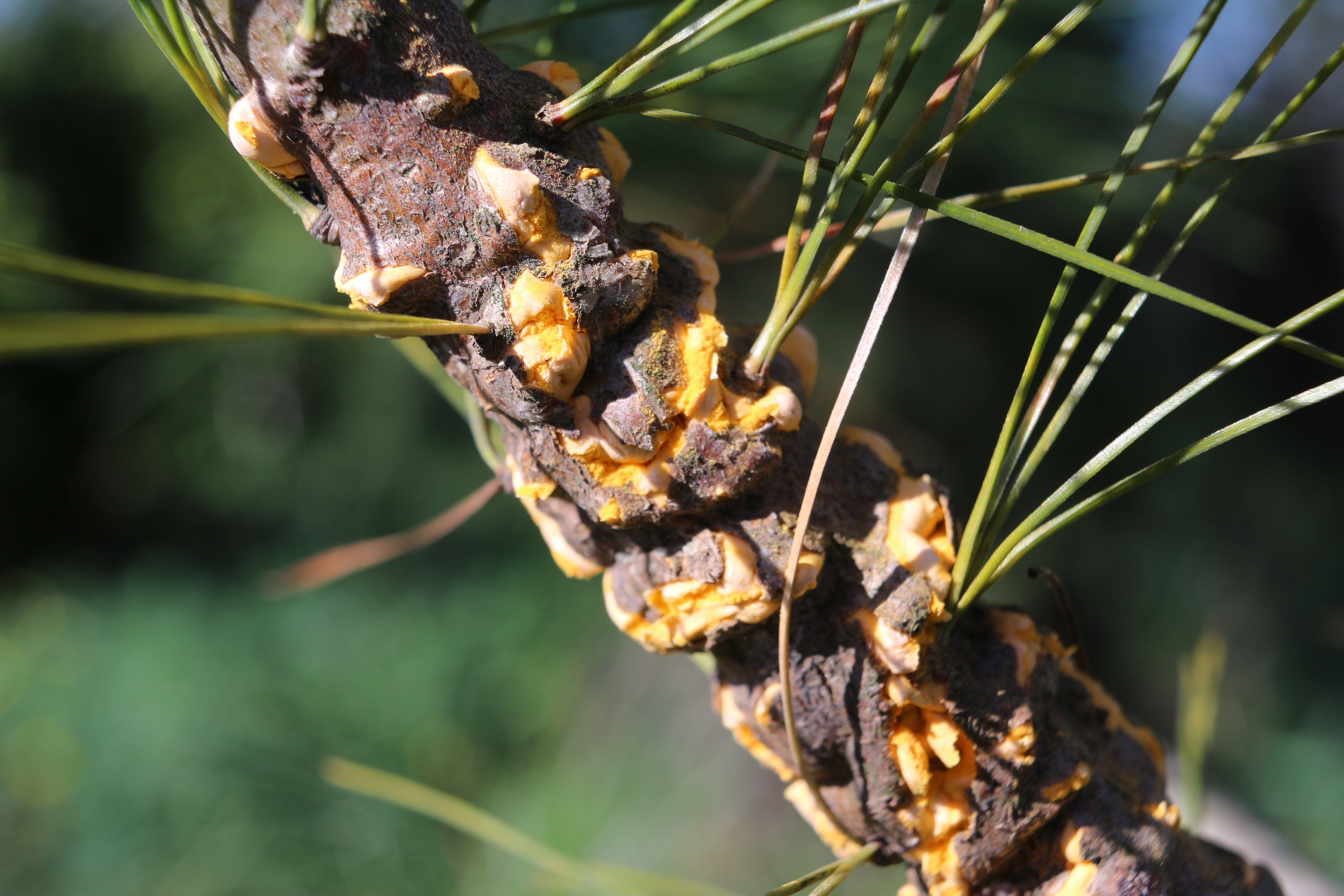
On Pinus strobus (aecial host)

On the aecial host, the first signs of C. ribicola are yellow or red spots on the Pinus needles, but these are small and can be difficult to see; more visible symptoms on the aecial host includes perennial cankers which appear on the branches within two years of infection. Looking at the infected plant as a whole, the Pinus will appear chlorotic, and stunted with dead branches or tops that turn a bright red color.

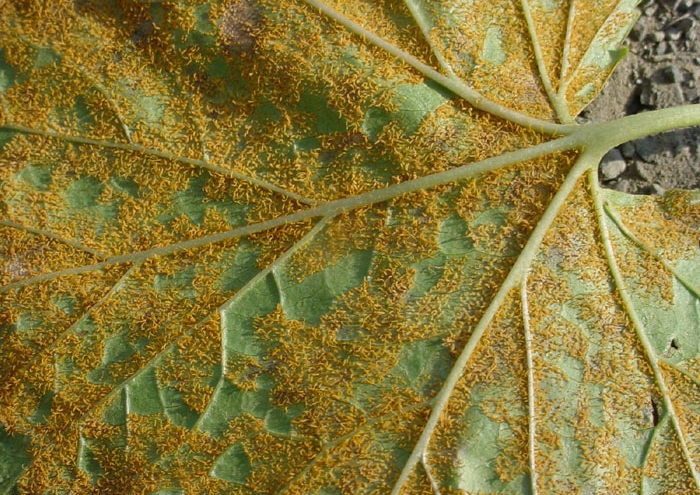
Leaf spots on the underside of a leaf on a Ribes species (telial host)

On the other hand, the telial host, Ribes, can contract yellowish chlorotic leaf spots, but is otherwise not significantly impacted. The signs of C. ribicola on Ribes, come in the form of the pathogen itself as orange pustules on the underside of the leaf.

== Environment ==
Environmentally, Cronartium ribicola prefers cooler temperatures coupled with moist conditions in low-lying areas, especially during the late summer and early fall. The low temperatures and humidity are an essential part of the pathogen's spore germination and dispersal requirements. The combination of cooler temperatures and a high humidity create an environment at which dew can easily form. The free water helps loosen spores adhered to a leaf's surface and promotes spore germination.

At a microclimate scale, lower trees hidden below the canopy exist in a lower temperature and moister environment, and as a result, these young trees are more susceptible to C. ribicola than the older, taller trees that create the canopy, which consequently have more access to the warm, dry sun. This collection of environmental characteristics are common in the Northern Hemisphere, causing many areas in the United States to be labeled at hazard zones for the genus Pinus.

== Disease management ==
Historically, tactics such as alternate host removal and planting restrictions in hazard zones, as well as quarantines made legal by the 1912 Plant Quarantine Act. Removal of Ribes used to be practiced in full force, which heavily affected blackcurrant production in the United States, however through a combination of the pathogen's hardiness and ability to travel airborne for nine hundred feet, as well as the Ribes ability to regrow from an extremely small root portion, researchers have focused their efforts on creating new cultural practices to lower the abundance of C. ribicola. Since then, researchers have devised multiple new methods to curb the spread of the infection. In some European countries and Canada, the fruits from currants and gooseberry were more valuable than the White pine trees, which did not allow them to do the eradication programs of Ribes.

For example, careful topological selection of plot sites for the white pine would greatly reduce the germination of spores. These plots would include land with characteristics such as well-drained soil such as that on a high-sloped area, spots that are well aerated, and face the south for dryness and warmth. This would remove the wet, damp environment that is crucial for the germination of the spores on the Pinus.

Once plantation spots have been chosen, pruning and inspection practices have been adapted as a monitored cultural practice. Inspections for blister rusts begin in May about six years after the trees are planted. This time period is when obvious symptoms of C. ribicola begin to appear, such as red needles. Infected branches will be pruned to a certain height that is dependent on a rate of infection determined by researchers; generally pruning is required for Pinus trees up to anywhere between nine and eighteen feet. Pathological pruning, in which all lower branches are pruned regardless of signs or symptoms of infection, may reduce disease instance in white pine tree stands.

Furthermore, genetic hybridization testing has been conducted for more than half a century to find resistance among strains of the species, and has since successfully introduced resistance into the eastern white pine.

== Importance ==
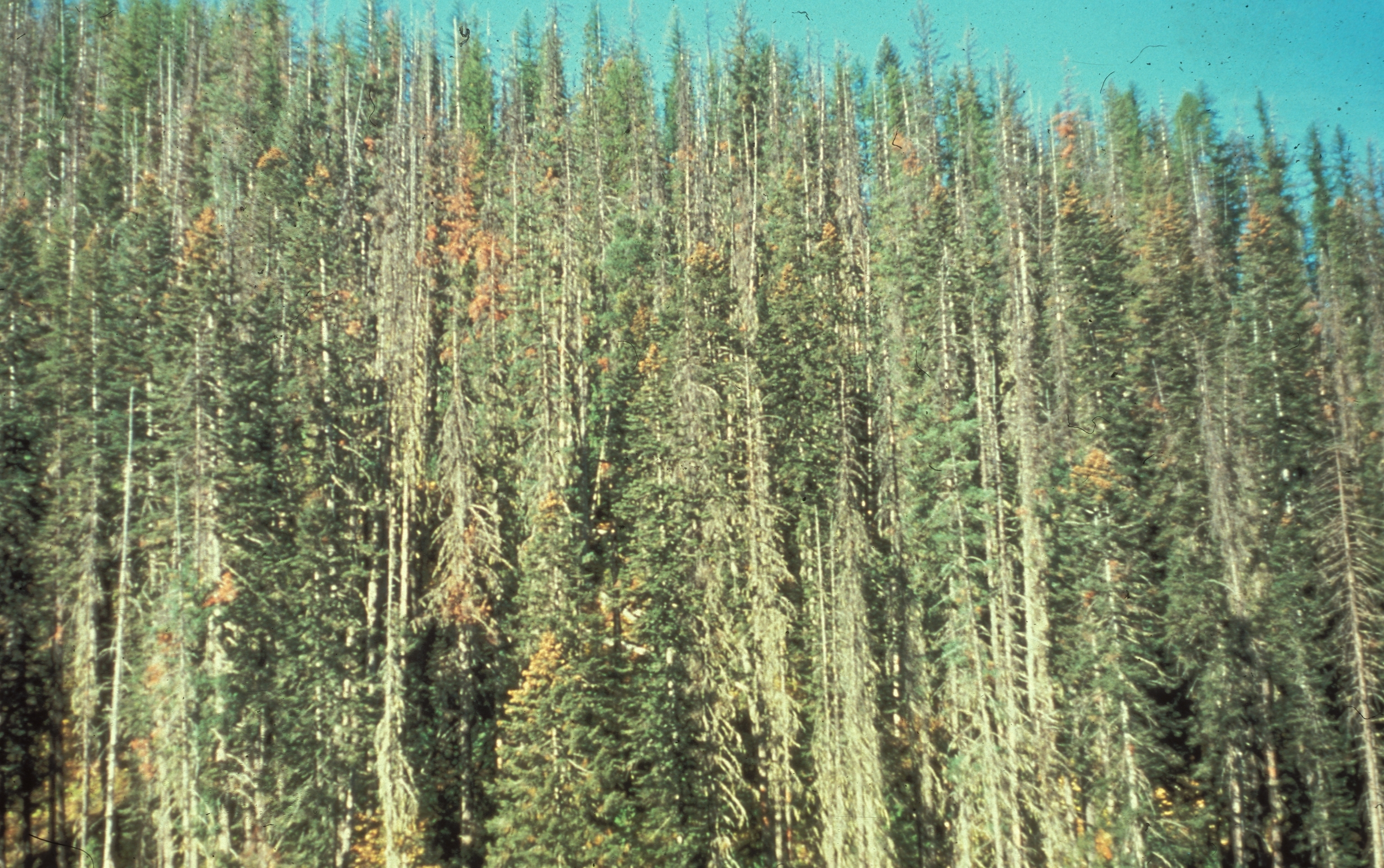
Forest decimated by Cronartium ribicola

White pine blister rust is the only rust of white pine. Of the five needle pines, sugar pine (Pinus lambertiana), eastern white pine (Pinus strobus), and western white pine (Pinus monticola) are the most economically important for timber harvest and nursery stock. In fact, forests of these species represent some of the most valuable land for timber harvest in the US, as they fetch a premium price over related species. While species such as whitebark pine (Pinus albicaulis) and limber pine (Pinus flexilis) are of less economic importance, they too are affected by Cronartium ribicola, as well as other five-needle pine species across the US. In the early 1900s, large outbreaks of C. ribicola infestation in stands of sugar pines, eastern white pines, and western white pines resulted in the observation of apparently resistant trees, asymptomatic in heavily infected areas. By 1950, breeding programs were in place to use these remaining trees as parents to cross and backcross with progeny to develop rust-resistant varieties. There are now resistant western white pine trees available.

The notion that eradication of the alternate host Ribes spp. would be an effective means of controlling the causal agent was largely responsible for the federal ban restricting cultivation of Ribes in the 1920s. Until 1966, when the ban was lifted, US breeding efforts in Ribes were essentially halted. Today, although some state and local bans remain in place, Ribes cultivars are slowly gaining popularity and many resistant varieties are commercially available.

== Pathogenesis ==
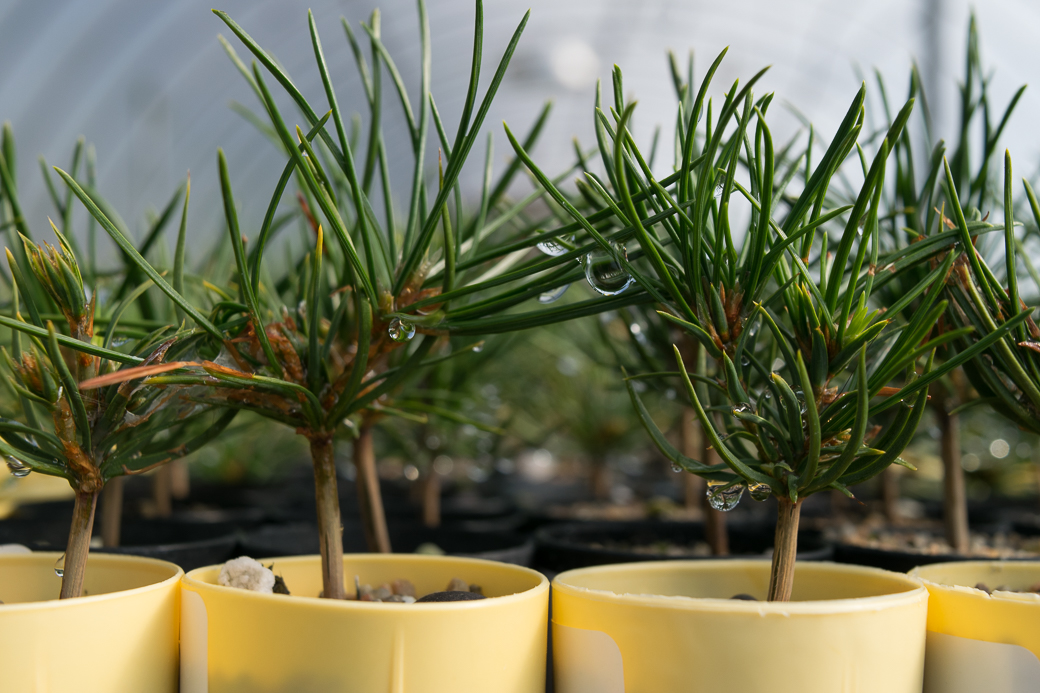
Pine seedlings being bred to resist white pine blister rust by the US Forest Service

Cronartium ribicola is a heteroecious, macrocyclic pathogen on Pinus spp and Ribes spp. Because young pines are smaller and less developed than mature trees, they are most susceptible to the pathogen. In addition, young trees will often die at faster rates following infection because more needles are likely to be located closer to the main stem (trunk) of the tree, where infection results in canker formation that kills vital cambial tissue responsible for water and nutrient transport for large parts of the tree.

Most of the breeding efforts for five-needle pine resistance are currently focused in North America, on P. strobus, P. monticola and P. lambertiana. The means of resistance in rust-resistant five-needle pine varieties involve various mechanisms, such as abortion of infected leaves and slow development of canker symptoms. It is likely that varieties exhibiting the latter mechanism act against the pathogen's ability to modify cell walls and avoid plant recognition. In some species of North American pine, hypersensitive responses to C. ribicola have been observed, which suggests a gene-for-gene interaction that may indicate that C. ribicola is not so ecologically foreign to North American pines as previously assumed.
