= Ribes burejense =

Scientific classification
- Kingdom: Plantae
- Clade: Tracheophytes
- Clade: Angiosperms
- Clade: Eudicots
- Order: Saxifragales
- Family: Grossulariaceae
- Genus: Ribes
- Species: R. burejense

Binomial name
- Ribes burejense F.Schmidt

Species of plant

Ribes burejense, commonly referred to as the Bureja gooseberry, is a species of flowering plant in the family Grossulariaceae, which includes currants and gooseberries. It is considered to be closely related to Ribes aciculare and shares several morphological characteristics with that species.

Like other Ribes species, R. burejense is particularly susceptible to honey fungus.
