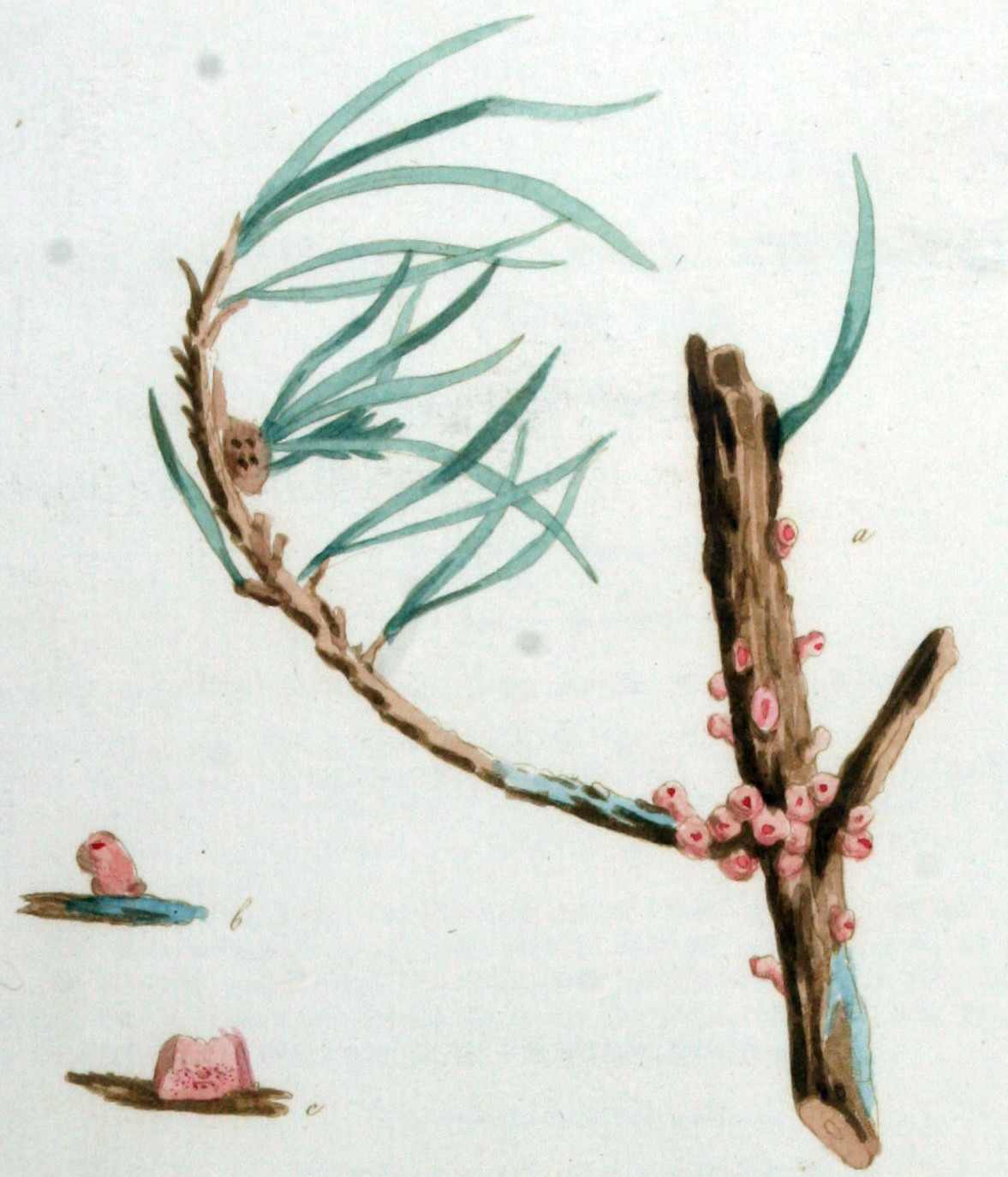
- Peridermium pini var. acicola

Scientific classification
- Kingdom: Fungi
- Division: Basidiomycota
- Class: Pucciniomycetes
- Order: Pucciniales
- Family: Cronartiaceae
- Genus: Peridermium; J.C.Schmidt & Kunze (1817)

Species
- See text

= Peridermium =

Genus of fungi

Peridermium is a genus of rust fungi in the family Cronartiaceae.

The genus was circumscribed by Johann Carl Schmidt and Gustav Kunze in 1817. Species include Peridermium californicum.

== Subtaxa ==
Peridermium includes the following species and varieties:

- Peridermium abietinum
  - Peridermium abietinum var. abietinum
  - Peridermium abietinum var. decolorans
- Peridermium acerifolium
- Peridermium acicola
- Peridermium acicolum
- Peridermium apocynaceum
- Peridermium appalachianum
- Peridermium balansae
- Peridermium balsameum
- Peridermium barteti
- Peridermium betheli
- Peridermium bethelii
- Peridermium boreale
- Peridermium boudieri
- Peridermium brevius
- Peridermium californicum
- Peridermium carneum
- Peridermium carpetanum
- Peridermium cedri
- Peridermium cerebroides
- Peridermium cerebrum
- Peridermium coloradense
- Peridermium columnare
- Peridermium complanatum
- Peridermium comptoniae
- Peridermium conigenum
- Peridermium conorum
- Peridermium conorum-piceae
- Peridermium consimile
- Peridermium cornui
- Peridermium corruscans
- Peridermium corticola
- Peridermium corui
- Peridermium decolorans
- Peridermium deformans
- Peridermium delicatulum
- Peridermium dieteli
- Peridermium dietelii
- Peridermium elatinum
- Peridermium elephantopi
- Peridermium elephantopodis
- Peridermium engelmanni
- Peridermium engelmannii
- Peridermium ephedrae
- Peridermium ephedrae
- Peridermium ephedricola
- Peridermium falciforme
- Peridermium filamentosum
- Peridermium fischeri
- Peridermium floridanum
- Peridermium fragile
- Peridermium fructigenum
- Peridermium fusiforme
- Peridermium germinale
- Peridermium giganteum
- Peridermium globosum
- Peridermium gracile
- Peridermium gracile
- Peridermium guatemalense
- Peridermium harknessii
- Peridermium helianthi
- Peridermium himalayense
- Peridermium holwayi
- Peridermium hydrangeae
- Peridermium inconspicuum
- Peridermium indicum
- Peridermium ingenuum
- Peridermium insulare
- Peridermium intermedium
- Peridermium ipomoeae
- Peridermium jaapii
- Peridermium japonicum
- Peridermium keteleeriae-evelynianae
- Peridermium klebahni
- Peridermium klebahnii
- Peridermium kosmahlii
- Peridermium kriegerii
- Peridermium krylowianum
- Peridermium kunmingense
- Peridermium kurilense
- Peridermium laricis
- Peridermium likiangense
- Peridermium likiangensis
- Peridermium loranthinum
- Peridermium magnusianum
- Peridermium magnusii
- Peridermium mexicanum
- Peridermium minutum
- Peridermium montanum
- Peridermium montezumae
- Peridermium oblongisporium
  - Peridermium oblongisporium var. oblongisporium
  - Peridermium oblongisporium var. ravenelii
- Peridermium oblongisporum
- Peridermium occidentale
- Peridermium orientale
- Peridermium ornamentale
- Peridermium parksianum
- Peridermium peckii
- Peridermium piceae
- Peridermium piceae-hondoensis
- Peridermium pini
- Peridermium pini
- Peridermium pini-densiflorae
- Peridermium pini-koraiensis
- Peridermium pini-thunbergii
- Peridermium pinicola
- Peridermium piriforme
- Peridermium plowrightii
- Peridermium praelongum
- Peridermium pseudo-balsameum
- Peridermium pseudobalsameum
- Peridermium pycnoconspicuum
- Peridermium pycnogrande
- Peridermium pyriforme
- Peridermium ravenelii
- Peridermium ribicola
- Peridermium rostrupii
- Peridermium rostrupii
- Peridermium rugosum
- Peridermium sinense
- Peridermium sinensis
- Peridermium soraueri
- Peridermium stahlii
- Peridermium stalactiforme
- Peridermium strobi
- Peridermium strobilinum
- Peridermium terebinthinaceae
- Peridermium thomsoni
- Peridermium thomsonii
- Peridermium truncicola
- Peridermium weirii
- Peridermium yamabense
- Peridermium yunshae
- Peridermium zilleri
