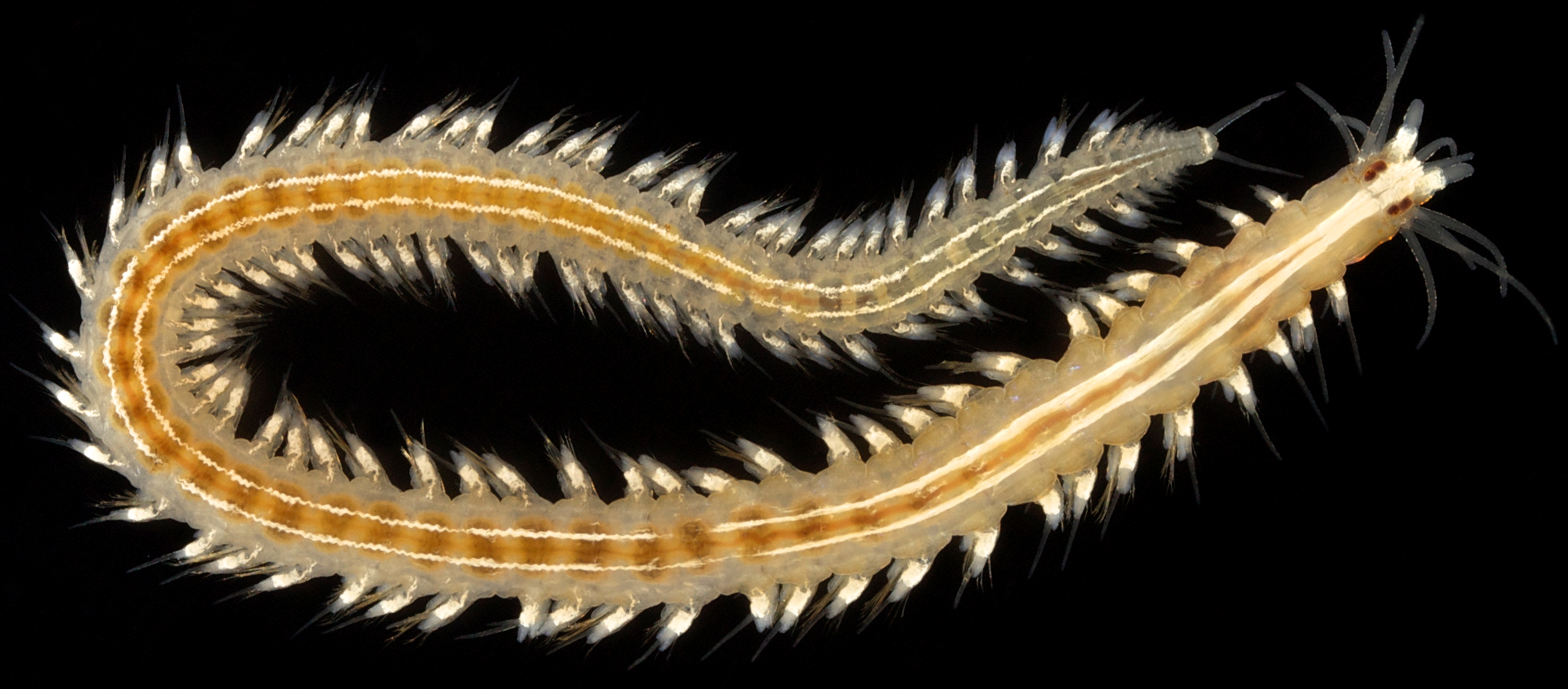
- Neanthes fucata

Scientific classification
- Kingdom: Animalia
- Phylum: Annelida
- Clade: Pleistoannelida
- Subclass: Errantia
- Order: Phyllodocida
- Family: Nereididae
- Subfamily: Nereidinae
- Genus: Neanthes; Kinberg, 1865

= Neanthes (annelid) =

Genus of annelid worms

Neanthes is a genus of polychaetes belonging to the family Nereididae.

- Sexual Proteomics: A proteomic analysis by Chandramouli et al. (2013) on the polychaete annelid Neanthes arenaceodentata identified sex-specific differences in protein expression. The study investigated the impact of reproductive activity on these protein variations, providing insights into the molecular mechanisms underlying sexual differentiation and reproduction in this species.

- Discovery of a Novel Species: Drennan et al. (2021) described Neanthes goodayi as a newly discovered annelid species within the Nereididae family. This species is uniquely adapted to the deep-sea environment, specifically inhabiting polymetallic nodules. The research provides a detailed morphological characterization of Neanthes goodayi, highlighting its distinctive traits and ecological adaptations to its extreme habitat.

- Annelid Communities at Whale Falls: Research by Georgieva et al. (2023) examined the annelid communities associated with a natural whale fall in the deep sea off eastern Australia. The study documented the diversity of annelid species, including members of the genus Neanthes, that colonize and utilize the organic-rich environment provided by the whale carcass. These findings contribute to a greater understanding of ecological dynamics in deep-sea ecosystems, particularly the role of annelids in decomposition processes and nutrient cycling related to large organic falls.

The genus has almost cosmopolitan distribution.

== Species ==
Species in this genus include:

- Neanthes abyssorum (Hartman, 1967)
- Neanthes acuminata (Ehlers, 1868)
- Neanthes arenaceodentata (Moore, 1903)
- Neanthes fucata (Savigny, 1822)
- Neanthes goodayi (Drennan, Wiklund, Rabone, Georgieva, Dahlgren & Glover, 2021)
