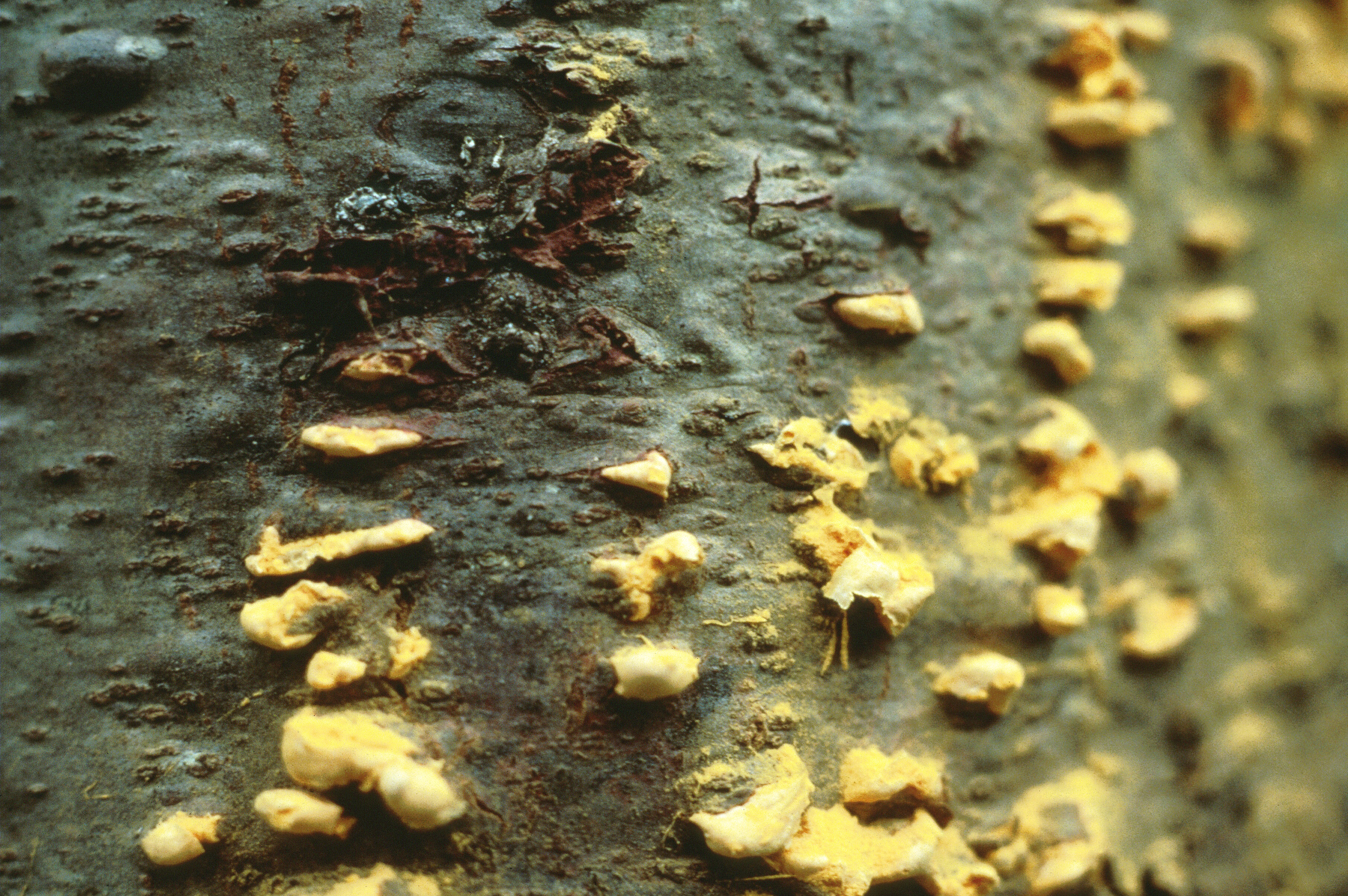
- Cronartium ribicola on Western White Pine

Scientific classification
- Kingdom: Fungi
- Division: Basidiomycota
- Class: Pucciniomycetes
- Order: Pucciniales
- Family: Cronartiaceae
- Genus: Cronartium; Fr.

Species
- See text

= Cronartium =

Genus of fungi

Cronartium is a genus of rust fungi in the family Cronartiaceae.

They are heteroecious rusts with two alternating hosts, typically a pine and a flowering plant, and up to five spore stages. Many of the species are plant diseases of major economic importance, causing significant damage.

Species, hosts and natural distribution

- Cronartium appalachianum: Pinus virginiana, Santalaceae. Eastern North America.
- Cronartium arizonicum: Pinus ponderosa and related pines, Scrophulariaceae. Western North America.
- Cronartium comandrae: Pinus subgenus Pinus, Santalaceae. North America.
- Cronartium comptoniae: Pinus subgenus Pinus, Myricaceae. North America.
- Cronartium conigenum: Pinus subgenus Pinus, Fagaceae. Southwestern North America.
- Cronartium pini: Pinus subgenus Pinus, several families. Europe, Asia.
- Cronartium occidentale: Strobus subgenus Strobus, Saxifragaceae. Southwestern North America.
- Cronartium orientale: Pinus subgenus Pinus Quercus. Japan.
- Cronartium quercuum: Pinus subgenus Pinus, Fagaceae. North America, Asia.
- Cronartium ribicola: Pinus subgenus Strobus, Grossulariaceae. Europe, Asia.
- Cronartium stalactiforme: Pinus subgenus Pinus, Scrophulariaceae. North America.
- Cronartium strobilinum: Pinus subgenus Pinus, Fagaceae. Southeastern North America.

Some of the species have been introduced accidentally outside of their natural ranges, notably C. ribicola into North America, where it is an invasive species causing heavy mortality in several pines which have little or no resistance to it.

== References and external links ==
- Millar, C. I. & Kinloch, B. B. (1991). Taxonomy, phylogeny, and coevolution of pines and their stem rusts. pp. 1–38 in: Hiratsuka, Y. et al. (1991). Rusts of pine. Proceedings of the IUFRO Rusts of Pine Working Party Conference. Forestry Canada Information Report NOR-X-317.
- Forestry Images: photos of some Cronartium rusts
