= Justin P. Moore =

American mycologist

Justin Payson Moore
- Born: May 8, 1840; Augusta, Maine, USA
- Died: August 10, 1923; Oakland, California, USA
- Known for: catalogue of USA Pacific Coast fungi; vice-president California Academy of Sciences
- Spouse: Charlotte D. Moore
- Scientific career
- Fields: mycology; librarianship

Justin Payson Moore (1840–1923) was a natural historian, particularly interested in mycology. He became vice-president of the California Academy of Sciences from 1880 - 1883.

== Career ==
Moore was elected a member of the California Academy of Sciences in 1875 and was the vice-president in 1880–1883 and again in 1886, although he resigned in October 1886.

Moore had broad interests in natural history but his major focus was fungi. He became the academy's curator of botany in 1882 and 1883. He co-authored the important early work Catalogue of the Pacific Coast Fungi with H. W. Harkness in 1880 (published by the California Academy of Sciences).

After 1886 he was not active in the academy but he donated books and money for rebuilding the academy after the 1906 earthquake and fire in San Francisco.

Moore resigned from the academy in 1889 and for 20 years from the late 1890s was librarian and assistant secretary of the Fire Underwriters Association of the Pacific.

== Personal life ==
Justin Payson Moore was born in Augusta, Maine on 8 May, probably in 1840. He was probably trained as a minister and sent to Benicia in California in October 1865 by the Congregational Home Missionary Society. Moore was married and his wife, Charlotte D. Moore, outlived him.
