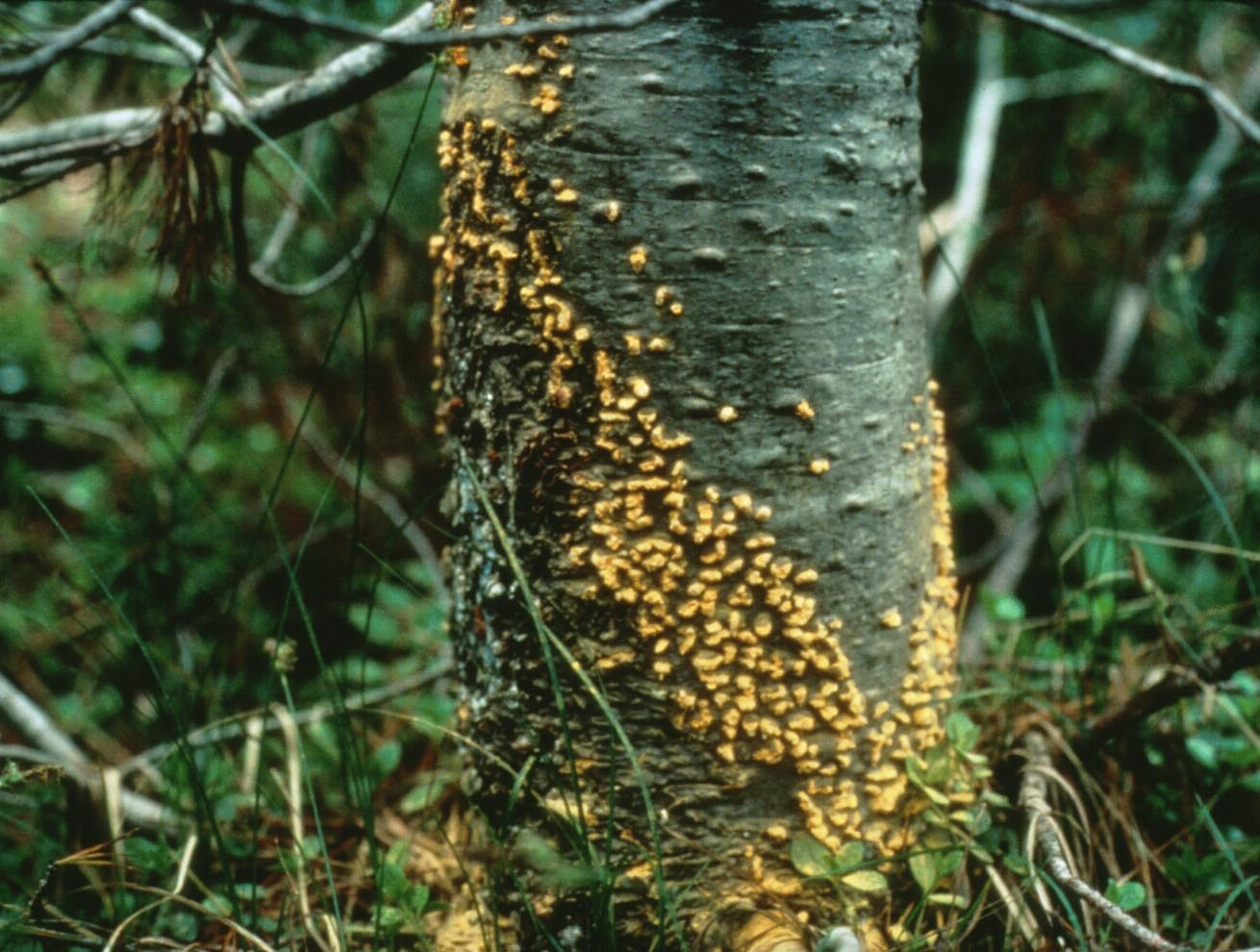
- Cronartium ribicola on Western White Pine

Scientific classification
- Kingdom: Fungi
- Division: Basidiomycota
- Class: Pucciniomycetes
- Order: Pucciniales
- Family: Cronartiaceae; Dietel (1900)

Type genus
- Cronartium Fr. (1815)

Genera
- Cronartium; Endocronartium; Peridermium

= Cronartiaceae =

Family of fungi

The Cronartiaceae are a family of rust fungi in the order Uredinales.

They are heteroecious rusts with two alternating hosts, typically a pine and a flowering plant, and up to five spore stages. Many of the species are plant diseases of major economic importance, causing significant damage and (in some cases) heavy mortality in conifers.
