= Aecium =

Reproductive structure of fungi producing aeciospores

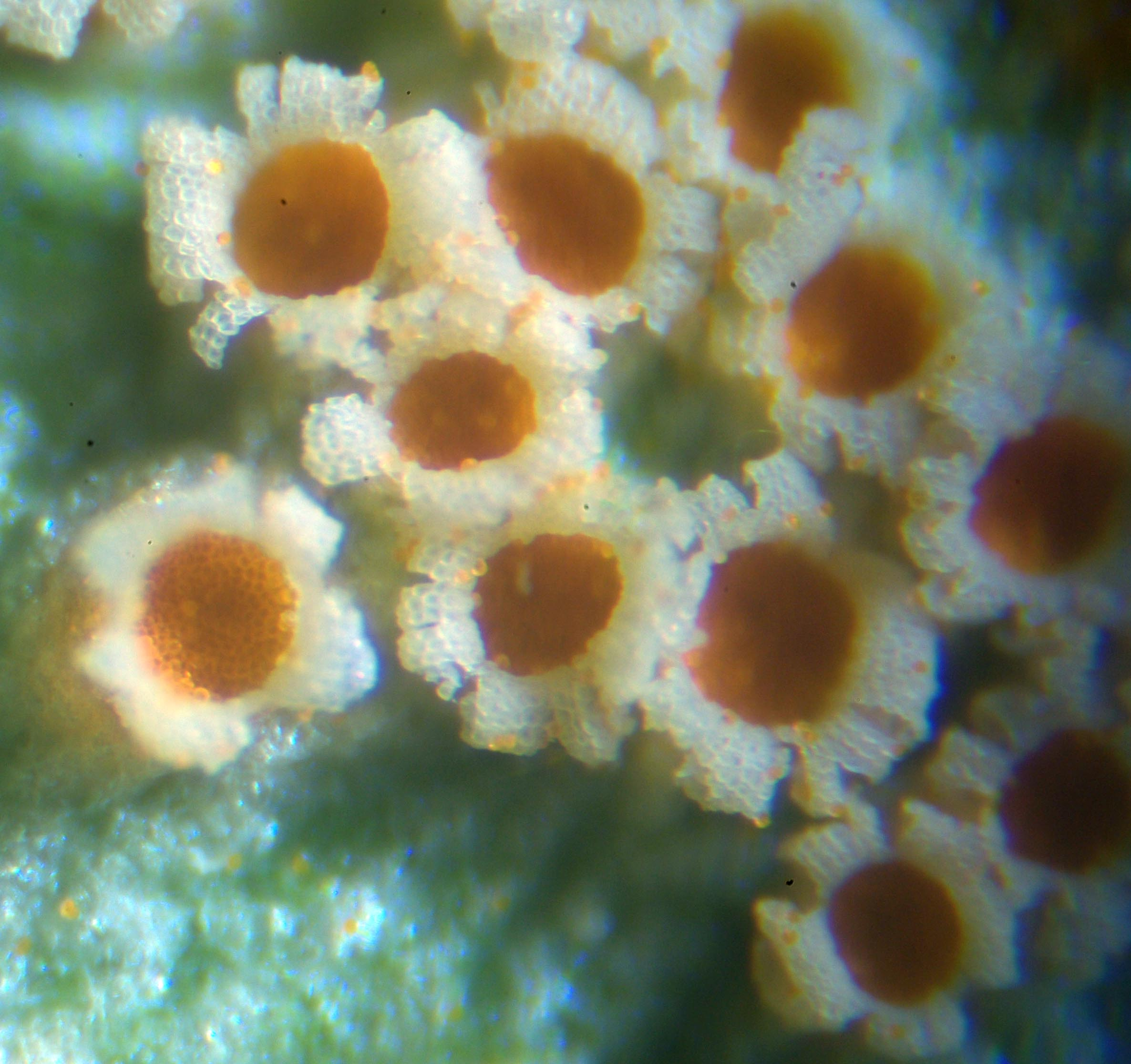
Close up of aecia of Puccinia sessilis

An aecium (plural aecia) is a specialised reproductive structure found in some plant pathogenic rust fungi that produce aeciospores. Aecia may also be referred to as "cluster cups". The term aecidium (plural aecidia) is used interchangeably but is not preferred.

In some rust fungi such as Phragmidium, aecia lack an outer wall structure (a peridium) but instead produce a diffuse aecium called a caeoma.

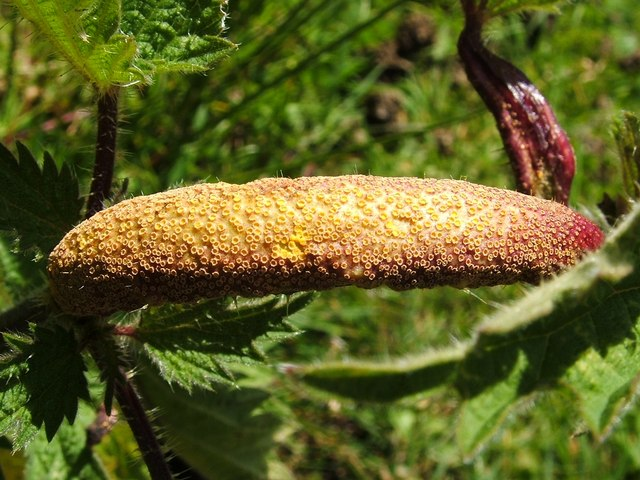
A rust gall covered with aecia

In some species of rust fungi with a life cycle including two different host plants, the binucleate spores produced in the aecia cannot infect the current plant host, but must infect a different plant species.
