= Ledi =

Ledi may refer to:

== People ==
- Ledi Bianku (born 1971), Albanian judge
- Ledi Sayadaw (1846–1923), Burmese monk
- Ledi Utomo (born 1983), Indonesian football player

== Places ==
- Ben Ledi, Scotland
- Ledi, Ayadaw, Myanmar
- Ledi, Minbu, Myanmar
- Ledi, Myaing, Myanmar
- Ledi, Pandaung, Myanmar
- Ledi, Pauk, Myanmar
- Ledi, Ye-U, Myanmar
- Ledi-Geraru, Ethiopia

== Species ==
- Chrysomyxa ledi, fungus
- Chrysomyxa ledi var. rhododendri
- Coleophora ledi, moth of the family Coleophoridae
- Lyonetia ledi, moth in the family Lyonetiidae

== Other ==
- LED Incapacitator
