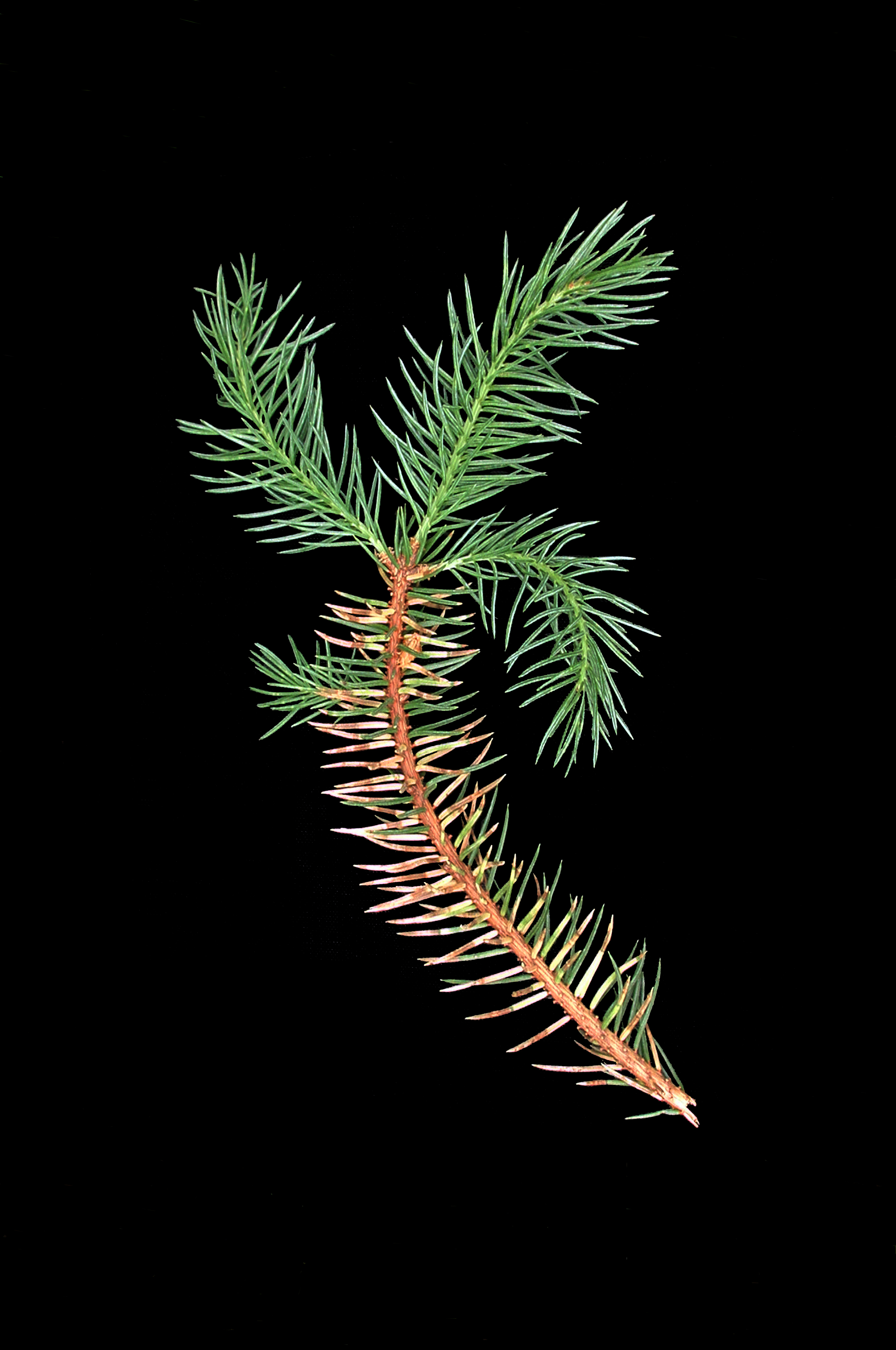
- A spruce shoot with symptoms of Weir's cushion rust (caused by the fungus Chrysomyxa weirii) on previous year's needles (Photo by Glen R. Stanosz, Professor of Tree and Forest Health, University of Wisconsin-Madison)

Scientific classification
- Kingdom: Fungi
- Division: Basidiomycota
- Class: Pucciniomycetes
- Order: Pucciniales
- Family: Coleosporiaceae
- Genus: Chrysomyxa
- Species: C. weirii

Binomial name
- Chrysomyxa weirii H.S.Jacks. (1917)

= Chrysomyxa weirii =

Species of fungus

Chrysomyxa weirii, is a fungus that causes a disease, commonly known as Weir's cushion rust, of spruce trees. It is mostly a cosmetic problem, causing yellowish spotting and banding on spruce needles, but in some cases can cause severe premature defoliation. Weir's cushion rust can also disfigure and reduce growth of spruce trees by targeting the tender needles of newly emerging shoots. This pathogen's spores are spread by wind and water splash and germinate to infect newly developing needles on the same spruce, or neighboring spruce trees. Unlike many other rust disease pathogens, C. weirii is autoecious, only infecting spruce trees (no alternate host). C. weirii is also microcyclic, producing only two of the five possible spore stages common in rust fungi. Trees affected by Weir's cushion rust usually have obvious symptoms, but if treated correctly, the disease can be managed.

== Importance ==
Weir's cushion rust is important to consumers, homeowners, and commercial growers. Consumers are recommended to inspect spruce trees for this disease prior to purchase to prevent introduction of the fungus into a location that is void of the disease. Homeowners with spruce trees should inspect their tree(s) in late summer and early spring for symptoms of Weir's cushion rust, and, if found, treat the disease before it can spread to additional spruce trees. Weir's cushion rust can be a significant problem in commercial nurseries, such as those that grow Christmas trees. The C. weirii fungus survives by infecting young needles, causing reduced growth and disfiguration. In an industry where the quality of tree foliage is paramount, the effects of this disease can prove very detrimental. If a Christmas tree farm shows incidence of this disease, it could adversely affect their sales in both the short and long-term if not adequately addressed, as the disease can persist for years if left unchecked.

== Symptoms and signs ==
Weir's cushion rust is first noticeable as yellow flecks on needles in the winter. By midsummer, it forms pale-yellow bands on the needles, which will darken in color as the season progresses. The bands are most noticeable on overcast days. By late summer, the yellow-orange telia are visible to the naked eye on the most recent growth. Needles that were infected the previous year turn brown and then defoliate. In order for a definitive diagnosis, teliospores must be examined under a microscope to confirm the presence of C. weirii.

In general, infected trees may suffer from reduced growth, disfigurement, discoloration of the needles and premature needle drop.

== Host species and range ==
Several spruce species (Picea sp.) are susceptible to Weir's cushion rust, caused by C. weirii, including Engelmann spruce (P. englemannii), white spruce (P. glauca), black spruce (P. mariana), Colorado blue spruce (P. pungens), and Sitka spruce (P. sitchensis).

Native to the western United States, Weir's cushion rust can be found from Washington state to the Black Hills of South Dakota, and from the southern Appalachian Mountains to Vermont. The first report of the disease in the Great Lakes region of the United States was in Wisconsin in 2002, and in 2012 it was discovered in the upper peninsula of Michigan. It is also found in most provinces in Canada.

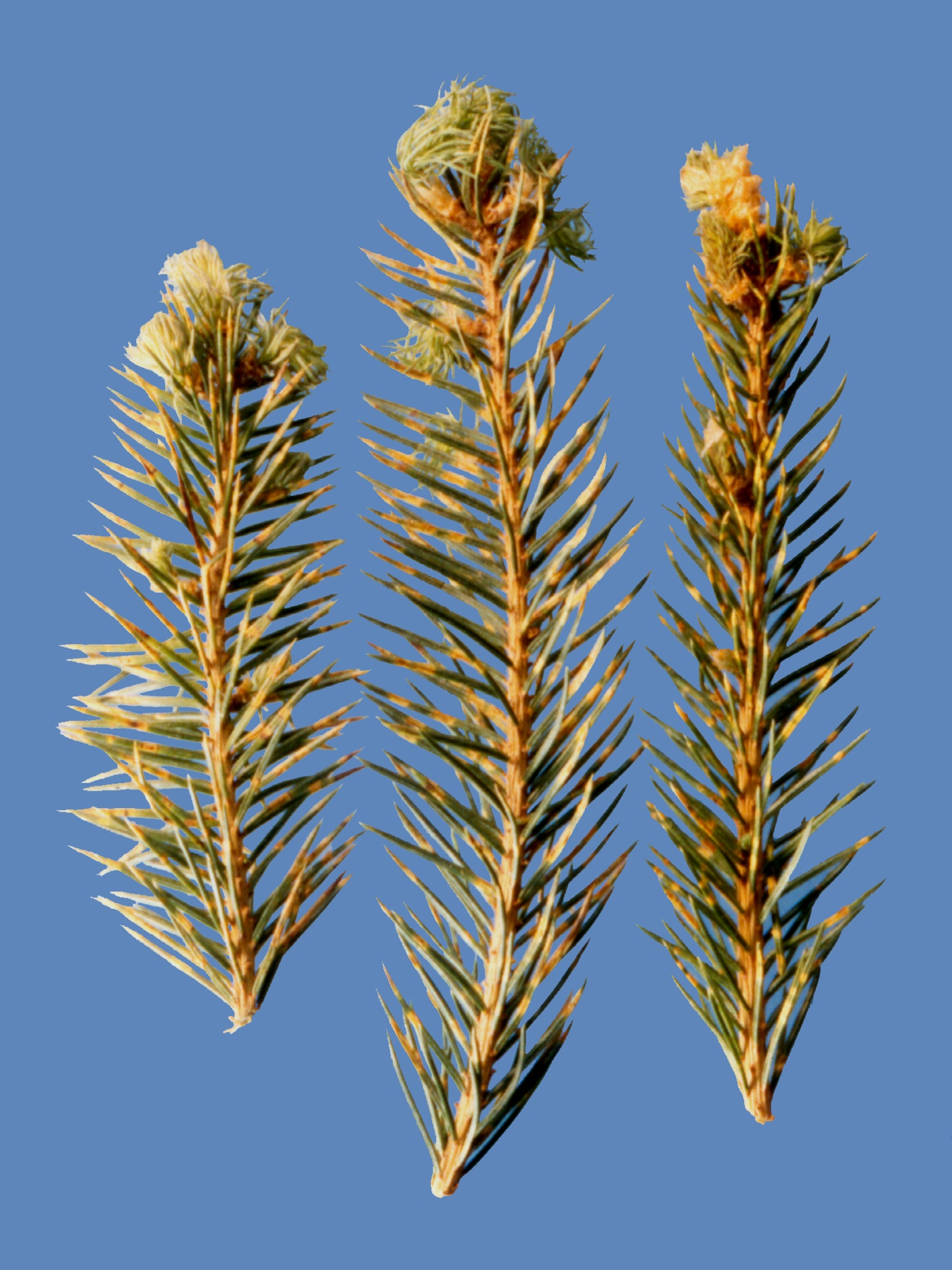
Spruce shoots with characteristic Weir's cushion rust needle symptoms (Photo by Glen R. Stanosz, Professor of Tree and Forest Health, University of Wisconsin-Madison)

== Disease cycle ==
Weir's cushion rust is unusual among rust diseases in that it does not need an alternate host, and survives solely on spruce trees. Additionally, the causal fungus, C. weirii, only produces two of the five spore types common in rusts: teliospores and basidiospores. C. weirii is thus considered monocyclic, and will only infect one host per growing season.

In the disease cycle for C. weirii, new infections occur in the spring, when spores (basidiospores) infect tender needles growing from new shoots. By summer, yellow bands can be seen on the infected needles. The fungus grows internally and matures throughout the summer, and overwinters as mycelium in the needles. The next spring (or, rarely, late summer), blisters form on infected needles, harboring structures called telia. Telia produce spores, called teliospores, which remain on the needle, unless splashed around by water. These spores appear as a yellow-orange mass (often visible to the naked eye or with a hand lens) emerging from the blisters.

Teliospores then germinate to produce additional structures, called basidia. Basidia, in turn, produce inoculum, called basidiospores, which will germinate followed by infection of spruce needles. Release of basidiospores coincides with new needle emergence on spruce trees. Dispersal is facilitated by wind and rain, which can carry these spores to other parts of the same tree, or to nearby trees. A new round of infection then commences, completing the one-year disease cycle of Weir's cushion rust. The infection period can continue for up to three weeks and is more severe during periods of high moisture. Infected needles tend to fall off prematurely after 14 months, and cease producing spores.

== Management ==
For most home owners, spruce needle rust is mostly a cosmetic disease and methods of control are usually unnecessary. In commercial industries, however, the adverse effect of the fungus on the trees may warrant treatment applications. Infected needles yellow and eventually fall, which can cause the tree to become thin-crowned and unmarketable.

To prevent infection, seedlings should be examined for the disease prior to planting. Diseased trees in nurseries should be removed to reduce the amount of inoculum. Because wet conditions are favorable for infection, trees should be spaced to allow for adequate air circulation, helping to allow drying of needles. Weed levels should be kept low to further reduce moisture.

=== Chemical control ===
Chemical control is possible through the use of fungicides. Chloranthonil is one fungicide that may be labeled for application to spruces in some locations and may reduce severity of Weir's cushion rust. Application should begin when 10% of the trees have broken some buds and then reapplied weekly after that until the needles are mature or the infected needles have fallen. This usually requires 3–5 applications of fungicide. Spraying does not, however, kill the pathogen in already infected needles; it merely prevents colonization of healthy needles.
