= Chrysomyxa pyrolae =

Scientific classification
- Domain: Eukaryota
- Kingdom: Fungi
- Division: Basidiomycota
- Class: Pucciniomycetes
- Order: Pucciniales
- Family: Coleosporiaceae
- Genus: Chrysomyxa
- Species: C. pyrolae

Binomial name
- Chrysomyxa pyrolae (DC.) Rostr.

Synonyms
- Chrysomyxa pirolata G. Winter

Species of fungus

Chrysomyxa pyrolae, is a species of rust fungi in the family Coleosporiaceae that can be found in such US states such as Alabama, Colorado, Maine and Vermont.
