= Diaphanopellis =

Scientific classification
- Kingdom: Fungi
- Division: Basidiomycota
- Class: Pucciniomycetes
- Order: Pucciniales
- Family: Coleosporiaceae
- Genus: Diaphanopellis; P.E.Crane (2005)

Type species
- Diaphanopellis forrestii P.E.Crane (2005)

Genus of fungi

Diaphanopellis is a genus of rust fungi in the family Coleosporiaceae. Reported as new to science in 2005, the genus is monotypic, containing the single species Diaphanopellis forrestii, found growing on Rhododendron selense subsp. selense, in the Himalayas.

Another species Diaphanopellis purpurea C.J. You & J. Cao (2017) was re-named as Chrysomyxa purpure in 2021.
