= Chrysomyxa succinea =

Scientific classification
- Domain: Eukaryota
- Kingdom: Fungi
- Division: Basidiomycota
- Class: Pucciniomycetes
- Order: Pucciniales
- Family: Coleosporiaceae
- Genus: Chrysomyxa
- Species: C. succinea

Binomial name
- Chrysomyxa succinea (Sacc.) Tranzschel

Synonyms
- Gloeosporium succineum Sacc.; Stilbechrysomyxa succinea (Sacc.) M.M. Chen

Species of fungus

Chrysomyxa succinea is a species of rust fungus in the family Coleosporiaceae which was introduced to Japan where it feeds on Rhododendron dilatatum. The species were recorded from mountains such as Fuji Gotenniwa, Fuji Oniwa and the Yatsugatake Mountains.
