= Chrysomyxa piperiana =

Scientific classification
- Kingdom: Fungi
- Division: Basidiomycota
- Class: Pucciniomycetes
- Order: Pucciniales
- Family: Coleosporiaceae
- Genus: Chrysomyxa
- Species: C. piperiana

Binomial name
- Chrysomyxa piperiana (Arthur) Hotson, (1925)

Species of fungus

Chrysomyxa piperiana is a plant pathogen.
