= Chrysomyxa roanensis =

Scientific classification
- Domain: Eukaryota
- Kingdom: Fungi
- Division: Basidiomycota
- Class: Pucciniomycetes
- Order: Pucciniales
- Family: Coleosporiaceae
- Genus: Chrysomyxa
- Species: C. roanensis

Binomial name
- Chrysomyxa roanensis (Arthur) Arthur (1934)

Species of fungus

Chrysomyxa roanensis is a plant pathogen.
