= Chrysomyxa cassandrae =

Scientific classification
- Kingdom: Fungi
- Division: Basidiomycota
- Class: Pucciniomycetes
- Order: Pucciniales
- Family: Coleosporiaceae
- Genus: Chrysomyxa
- Species: C. cassandrae

Binomial name
- Chrysomyxa cassandrae Tranzschel

Species of fungus

Chrysomyxa cassandrae is a fungus that occurs throughout the North Temperate Zone wherever Chamaedaphne calyculata occurs, independent of host alternation. Aecial hosts of this species include the white spruce.
