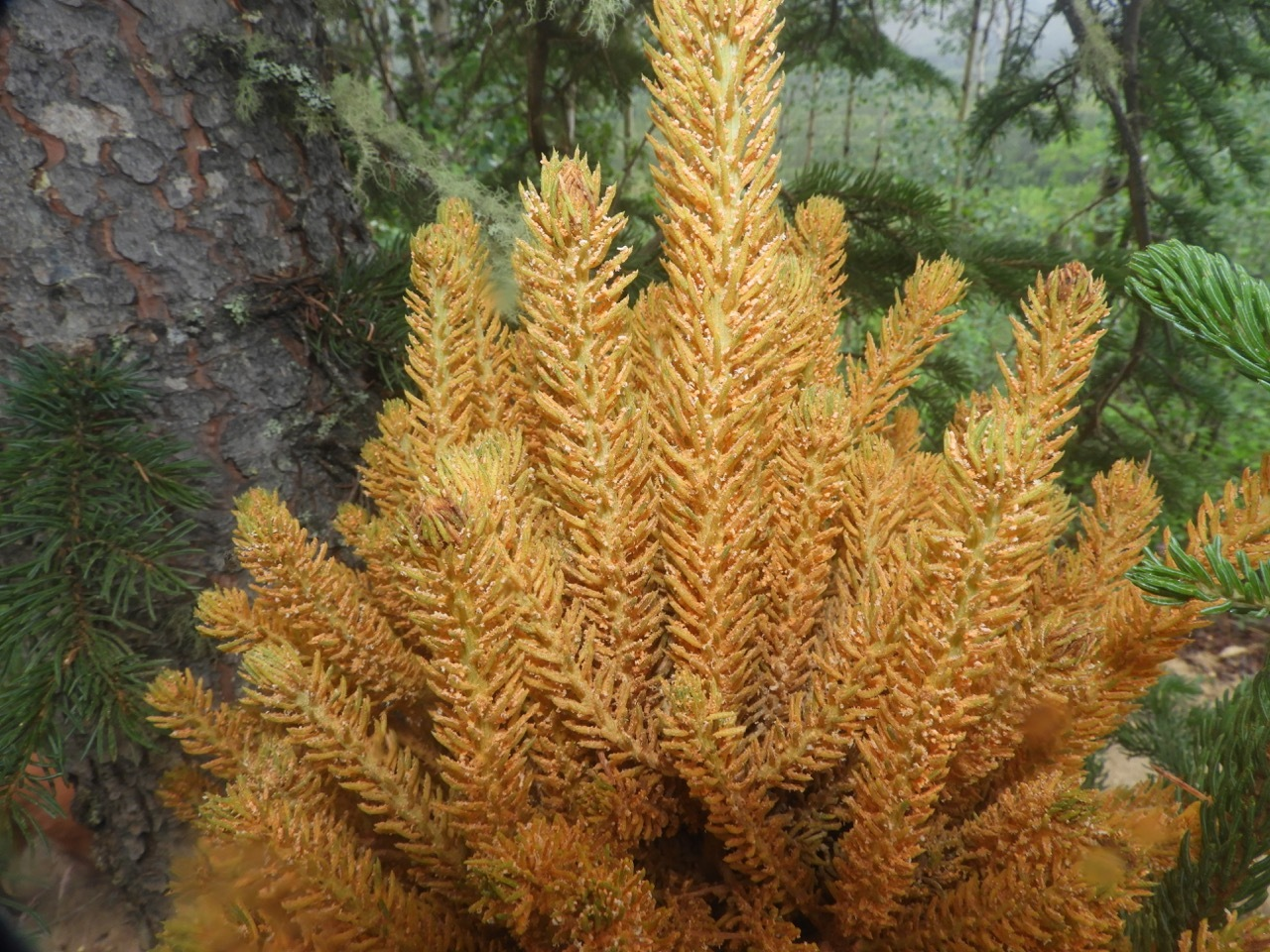
- Spruce witch's broom, Chena R State Park, Fairbanks North Star County, Alaska, U.S.

Scientific classification
- Kingdom: Fungi
- Division: Basidiomycota
- Class: Pucciniomycetes
- Order: Pucciniales
- Family: Coleosporiaceae
- Genus: Chrysomyxa
- Species: C. arctostaphyli

Binomial name
- Chrysomyxa arctostaphyli Dietel

Synonyms
- Peridium coloradense (Dietel) Arth. & F. Kern

= Spruce broom rust =

Species of fungus

Spruce broom rust or yellow witches' broom rust is a fungal plant disease caused by the basidiomycete fungus known as Chrysomyxa arctostaphyli. It occurs exclusively in North America, with the most concentrated outbreaks occurring in northern Arizona and southern Colorado on blue and Engelmann spruce, as well as in Alaska on black and white spruce. This disease alternates its life cycle between two hosts, with the spruce serving as the primary host and bearberry (also known as kinnickinnick) serving as the secondary or alternate host. The name for the disease comes from the distinctive “witches broom”, commonly yellow in color, which forms on the spruce after young needles have been infected. Management must be carried out through physical or mechanical methods, such as the pruning of brooms or the removal of the secondary host from the area, because no chemical control measures (e.g. fungicides) have yet been determined to be economically effective. Generally, spruce broom rust is seen as a mostly cosmetic issue, and it is very rarely the direct cause of tree death; however, research has shown a reduction in overall productivity and health of infected trees, making it an important issue for logging and timber companies.

== Hosts ==
Since this pathogen is a heteroecious rust, C. arctostaphyli has a primary and an alternate host upon which it produces different fruiting structures and different spores unique to each structure. As implied in the disease name, spruce broom rust mainly affects four spruce species: white (Picea glauca), black (Picea mariana) Engelmann (Picea engelmannii) and Colorado blue (Picea pungens). The alternate host is bearberry, which can be any of three species in the genus Arctostaphylos. This host is also sometimes referred to as kinnikinnick, which is the Native American name for common bearberry (Arctostaphylos uva-ursi), which is in the family Ericaceae. The plant is named for the red edible berries it produces, which are a favorite food of bears when they can get them. They follow a similar life cycle to spruce, as they are both evergreens. There is also another far less common, yet still viable alternate host, manzanita (Arctostaphylos spp.).

== Signs and symptoms ==
Spruce broom rust is named from the so-called “witches brooms” which form as a result of infected needles on the spruce host. The “brooms” are actually needles that were infected from basidiospores from the bearberry alternate host in spring. Twig tissue is typically infected as well, allowing hyphae to spread into an entire branch of needles. In midsummer, bright yellow pustules which make up the broom can be seen. These are actually aecia containing aeciospores for dispersal, making the broom a sign of disease. From afar, there will appear to be a yellowing broom erupting from a portion of a spruce tree. As summer progresses, the aecia (infected needles) will begin to turn brown. In terms of symptoms of spruce broom rust, twigs of the brooms themselves are typically shorter and thicker than normal. Another common symptom is the formation of a canker or gall at the base of the broom. The main damage from the rust is simply overall volume and growth loss. The number of brooms as well as their proximity to the main stem can also play a role in determining the extent of the damage to the tree.

== Disease cycle ==
Chrysomyxa arctostaphyli is an obligate parasite, and as with most other rust fungi diseases, spruce broom rust requires two different host plants to carry out its life cycle and is therefore referred to as heteroecious. The primary or aecial host of the rust is spruce (Picea spp.), and the secondary or telia host of the rust is bearberry (Arctostaphylos uva-ursi). The alternative bearberry host is necessary for aeciospore germination, and is therefore essential for the rust's lifecycle. Spruce broom rust is a macrocyclic rust, meaning that the fungus produces more spore types in addition to teliospores and basidiospores. In midsummer, aecia appear on the epidermis of spruce needles as orange pustules. Eventually, these aecia rupture and release millions of microscopic, orange aeciospores, which are carried to bearberry by wind. These aeciospores are capable of infecting bearberry leaves; however, they are not able to reinfect spruce. Assuming favorable, moist environmental conditions upon the secondary host, these aeciospores germinate and the bearberry's leaves develop dark purple-brown blotches. Come springtime, these blotches develop waxy telia on the bottom of the leaves and pierce the bearberry's epidermis. Teliospores are produced by these telia and germinate to become basidiospores, which infect the primary spruce host when wind carries them to young, developing needles. This infection in the spruce is systemic and perennial, allowing the fungus to live in the brooms from year to year. Upon infection of the developing spruce needles, basidiospores produce haploid mycelia that form spermatia. These spermatia do not infect either host; rather, they serve as male gametes and fertilize receptive hyphae, forming dikaryotic mycelium and in turn dikaryotic aeciospores. From here the disease cycle repeats, and symptoms similar to last season arise on the spruce by midsummer. A feature unique to the Chrysomyxa arctostaphyli disease cycle is the fact that the fungus does not produce urediospores, and thus spruce broom rust is not a truly macrocyclic disease. The lack of urediospores prevents reinfection of the primary host within the same year.

== Environment ==
The intense odor given off from the spermogonia on the needles in the spring attract insects, which cross-fertilize the fungus. This fertilization allows for aecia to form and in turn produce aeciospores. Spruce broom rust is common in the western United States, specifically in the Rocky Mountain Region where it occurs on Colorado blue spruce, and in the boreal forests of Alaska and Canada where it parasitizes both white and black spruce. It was originally thought there was not a connection between bearberry and spruce as hosts, as bearberry had not been documented at such of altitudes of spruce in the Rocky Mountains; it was even initially postulated that the spores found on bearberry were caused by a microcyclic rust which only infected that host and did not have an alternate. However, it was eventually discovered that bearberry could be located in similar altitudes to spruce, and C. arctostaphyli was even found in bearberry at those altitudes. It was then experimentally proved that when bearberry were inoculated in a moist chamber with aeciospores from spruce brooms, telia would begin to form.

== Management ==
In general, spruce broom rust in considered more of a cosmetic issue, and in many cases no serious management measures are required. However, potential economic consequences can be seen in commercial logging areas. In order to manage this, trees with stem cankers or brooms are selectively removed or the brooms are pruned off of the trees. Pruning of brooms is the most effective and economical control option while still reducing the risk of stem breakage and maintaining tree vigor. If the infection occurs on the tree's main bole, the entire top must be removed, including the brooms. Additionally, since both bearberry and spruce must be in the same area for Chrysomyxa arctostaphyli to survive and complete its life cycle, there is the option to remove all bearberry within 1,000 feet of the spruce. Although effective, this route is often hard to accomplish and expensive. A related control measure would be to attempt to reduce moisture around the bearberry in order to prevent secondary infection, but the logistics of this would also be challenging. No chemical measures like fungicides have been found to be effective as of yet, so only the mechanical option of physically removing the brooms to prevent the spread of aeciospores is effective. Since spruce broom rust is mostly cosmetic, infections can potentially be left on the tree to provide habitat for birds and small mammals, which use the large, dense brooms for both resting and nesting.

== Importance ==
Spruce broom rust is an interesting pathogen in terms of its importance in forest management programs. Many spruce trees do not exhibit any symptoms of disease upon infection by Chrysomyxa arctostaphyli, and still many others display effects of a merely cosmetic nature. Besides obviously impacting visual quality, spruce broom rust can also have major, more economically important impacts on timber productivity. Nutrients that were originally sequestered for growth in spruce are redirected to the brooms, which can lead to a reduction in height and radial tree growth. For example, a 1963 US Forest Service study found that trees infected by Chrysomyxa arctostaphyli showed a 30 percent reduction in growth over the course of ten years as compared to healthy trees. The extent of this damage depends on the number and size of brooms, as well as their location. When brooms occur upon the primary bole of the spruce, this can lead to a phenomenon known as top kill, in which the portion of the spruce above the brooms dies. As the infection continues to grow and more sections of the tree die, new entrance ways open up for wood decaying fungi, such as red ring rot (Phellinus pini). These fungi are capable of devastating the volume of usable wood obtained from spruce trees, and in turn greatly reducing the trees’ marketable value, because they are highly specialized in removing the wood's structural compounds. Additionally, this internal wood decay causes spruce trees to become structurally unstable, posing relevant hazards in residential and recreational areas. Finally, although tree death is not common in infected trees, Chrysomyxa arctostaphyli may weaken the spruce and cause it to become highly vulnerable to other potential killers such as other fungi, bark beetles, or simply by increasing the tree's susceptibility to intense wind, water, and snow. The same 1963 US Forest Service study found that infected trees had a three times greater mortality rate over a ten-year period than healthy trees. Nevertheless, Chrysomyxa arctostaphyli may indeed play an ecologically vital role in the Yukon. Oftentimes squirrels, fishers, and other forest animals utilize cavities within brooms, especially those carved out by other wood decaying fungi, as sources of shelter and dens.
