= Chrysomyxa nagodhii =

Scientific classification
- Domain: Eukaryota
- Kingdom: Fungi
- Division: Basidiomycota
- Class: Pucciniomycetes
- Order: Pucciniales
- Family: Coleosporiaceae
- Genus: Chrysomyxa
- Species: C. nagodhii

Binomial name
- Chrysomyxa nagodhii P.E.Crane (2001)

Species of fungus

Chrysomyxa nagodhii is a species of rust fungus in the family Coleosporiaceae. It was described as new to science by Canadian mycologist Patricia E. Crane in 2001. It probably occurs throughout the range of Ledum decumbens (dwarf Labrador tea) and Rhododendron groenlandicum (bog Labrador tea). On Picea, spermogonia and aecia occur on distinct rusty yellow bands on current-year needles.
