= Chrysomyxa himalensis =

Scientific classification
- Domain: Eukaryota
- Kingdom: Fungi
- Division: Basidiomycota
- Class: Pucciniomycetes
- Order: Pucciniales
- Family: Coleosporiaceae
- Genus: Chrysomyxa
- Species: C. himalensis

Binomial name
- Chrysomyxa himalensis Barclay

Species of fungus

Chrysomyxa himalensis, (also called spruce needle rust) is a species of rust fungi in the Coleosporiaceae family that can be found on Rhododendron and Picea species in the Himalayan region of southern Asia and was introduced in the United States.
