= Chrysomyxa reticulata =

Scientific classification
- Domain: Eukaryota
- Kingdom: Fungi
- Division: Basidiomycota
- Class: Pucciniomycetes
- Order: Pucciniales
- Family: Coleosporiaceae
- Genus: Chrysomyxa
- Species: C. reticulata

Binomial name
- Chrysomyxa reticulata P.E.Crane

Species of fungus

Chrysomyxa reticulata has been found on Ledum decumbens and Ledum groenlandicum in both eastern (Nova Scotia) and western (Alberta, British Columbia) Canada, as well as Wisconsin, Washington, and California, in the United States, but the aecia are so far known only from artificial inoculation of white spruce (Crane 2001).
