= Chrysomyxa neoglandulosi =

Scientific classification
- Domain: Eukaryota
- Kingdom: Fungi
- Division: Basidiomycota
- Class: Pucciniomycetes
- Order: Pucciniales
- Family: Coleosporiaceae
- Genus: Chrysomyxa
- Species: C. neoglandulosi

Binomial name
- Chrysomyxa neoglandulosi P.E.Crane

Species of fungus

Chrysomyxa neoglandulosi is a fungus. It likely occurs wherever its telial host, Ledum glandulosum Nutt., is found. The only reported aecial host, Engelmann spruce, occurs in montane to subalpine areas in western Canada and the United States (Crane 2001).
