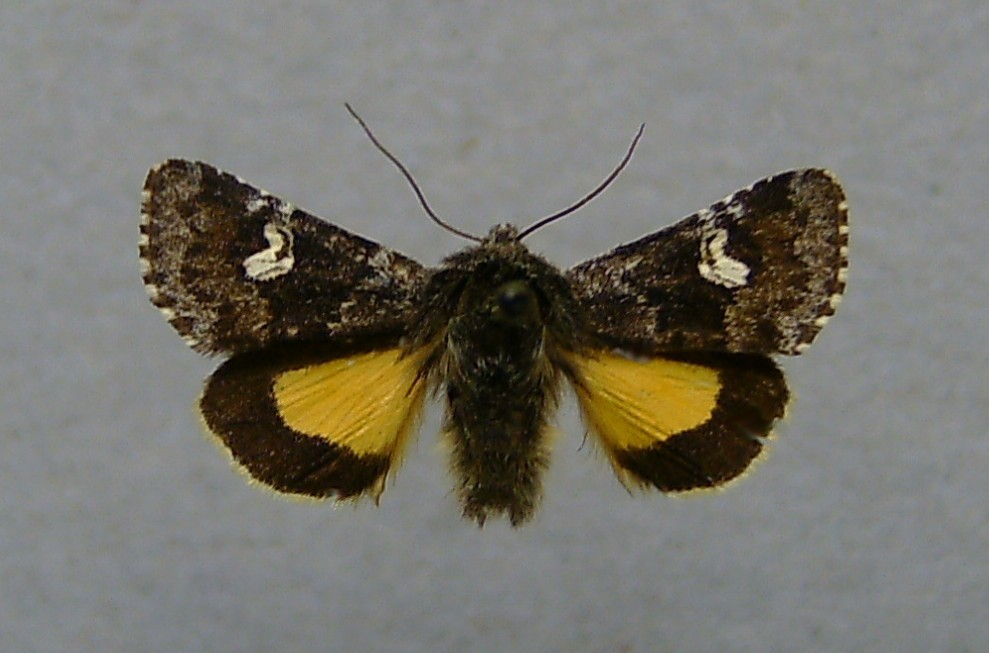

Scientific classification
- Kingdom: Animalia
- Phylum: Arthropoda
- Clade: Pancrustacea
- Class: Insecta
- Order: Lepidoptera
- Superfamily: Noctuoidea
- Family: Noctuidae
- Genus: Coranarta
- Species: C. cordigera

Binomial name
- Coranarta cordigera (Thunberg, 1788)

Synonyms
- Noctua cordigera; Anarta cordigera; Anarta cordigera alpestris; Anarta cordigera var. aethiops; Noctua albirena; Anarta variegata; Anarta suffusa; Coranarta aureola

= Coranarta cordigera =

Small dark yellow underwing

Species of moth

Coranarta cordigera, the small dark yellow underwing, is a moth of the family Noctuidae. The species was first described by Carl Peter Thunberg in 1788. It can be found in parts of Europe, mainly in the north. In central and southern Europe it is only found in mountainous areas. In the Alps for instance, it is found up to elevations of 2,200 meters.

== Description ==
The wingspan is 21–26 mm. Forewing blackish, dusted with pale grey scales especially in basal and marginal areas, the median being darker, or even black; inner and outer lines deep black; reniform stigma large and white with a grey lunule in it; orbicular small, grey and obscure; hindwing yellow with a broad black marginal border, the costal margin grey; ab. variegata Tutt is a rare form, in which the dark median area is traversed by a grey band between the stigmata, the space between outer and submarginal line filled in with black to form a fascia, and another following the basal line; — in suffusa Tutt the whole wing is black except the pale marginal area and the white reniform; — aethiops Hofm. has the entire wing black except the stigma; — while carbonaria Christ, from Siberia resembles aethiops above, but the underside of forewing is yellow with the marginal areas dark. — Larva purplish-red : dorsal line pale yellow, with dark oblique streaks beyond segment 4, meeting on the dorsum; subdorsal lines obscurely paler; spiracular line yellow with a black upper edge; spiracles yellow, each accompanied by a yellow blotch; sometimes the larva is wholly blackish, with the markings all obscured.

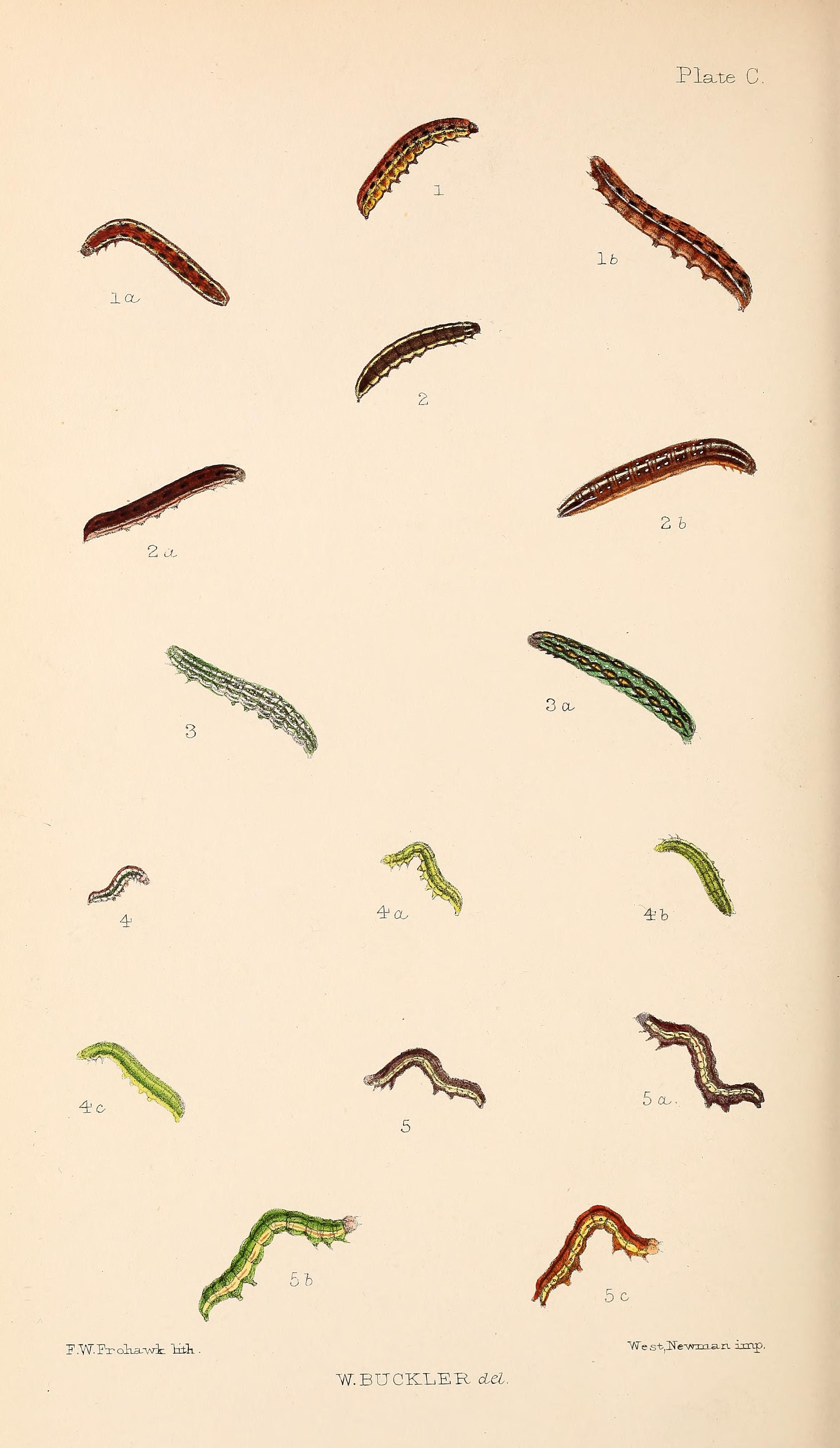
Figs.2, 2a, 2b larvae in various stages of growth

== Biology ==
The caterpillars feed on Vaccinium uliginosum and Arctostaphylos uva-ursi. The flight period is April to May -later at high altitudes.
