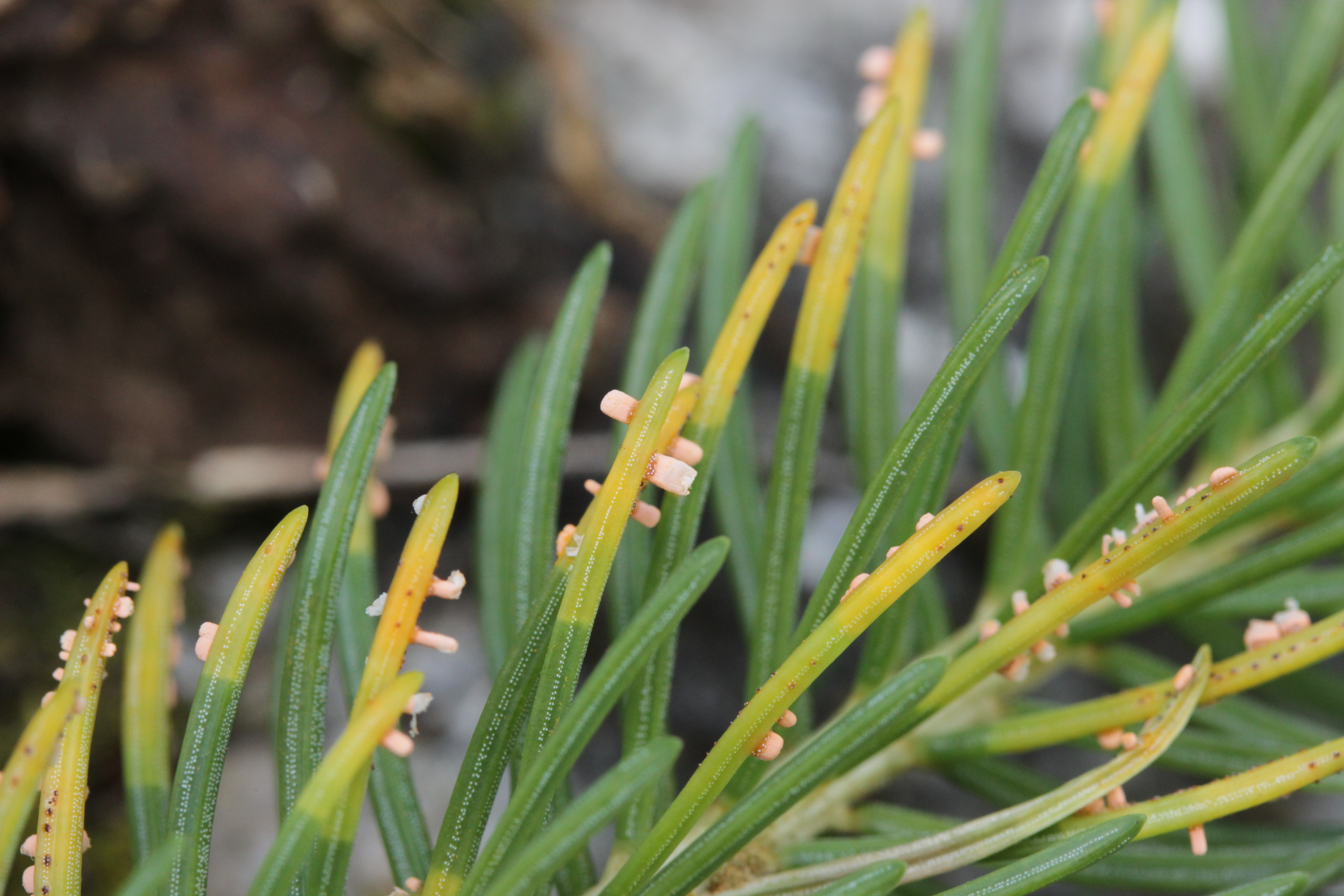

Scientific classification
- Kingdom: Fungi
- Division: Basidiomycota
- Class: Pucciniomycetes
- Order: Pucciniales
- Family: Coleosporiaceae
- Genus: Chrysomyxa
- Species: C. abietis

Binomial name
- Chrysomyxa abietis (Wallr.) Unger

Synonyms
- Blennoria abietis

= Chrysomyxa abietis =

Species of fungus

Chrysomyxa abietis, or spruce needle rust, is a species of rust fungi in the Coleosporiaceae family that is native to eastern Europe (including Siberia) and northern Asia. It was introduced to Australia, New Zealand and the United States.

== Description ==
The species is 14–42 micrometres (0.00055–0.00165 in) by 9–16 micrometres (0.00035–0.00063 in), smooth and wall thin. It is also hypophyllous and have either yellow of orange spots (depending on the season). The spots are elongate, erumpent and waxy. It teliospores are aseptate, hyaline and oblong. The pustules are orange in colour and are up to 10 millimetres (0.39 in) long.

== Habitat ==
It is found on spruce.
