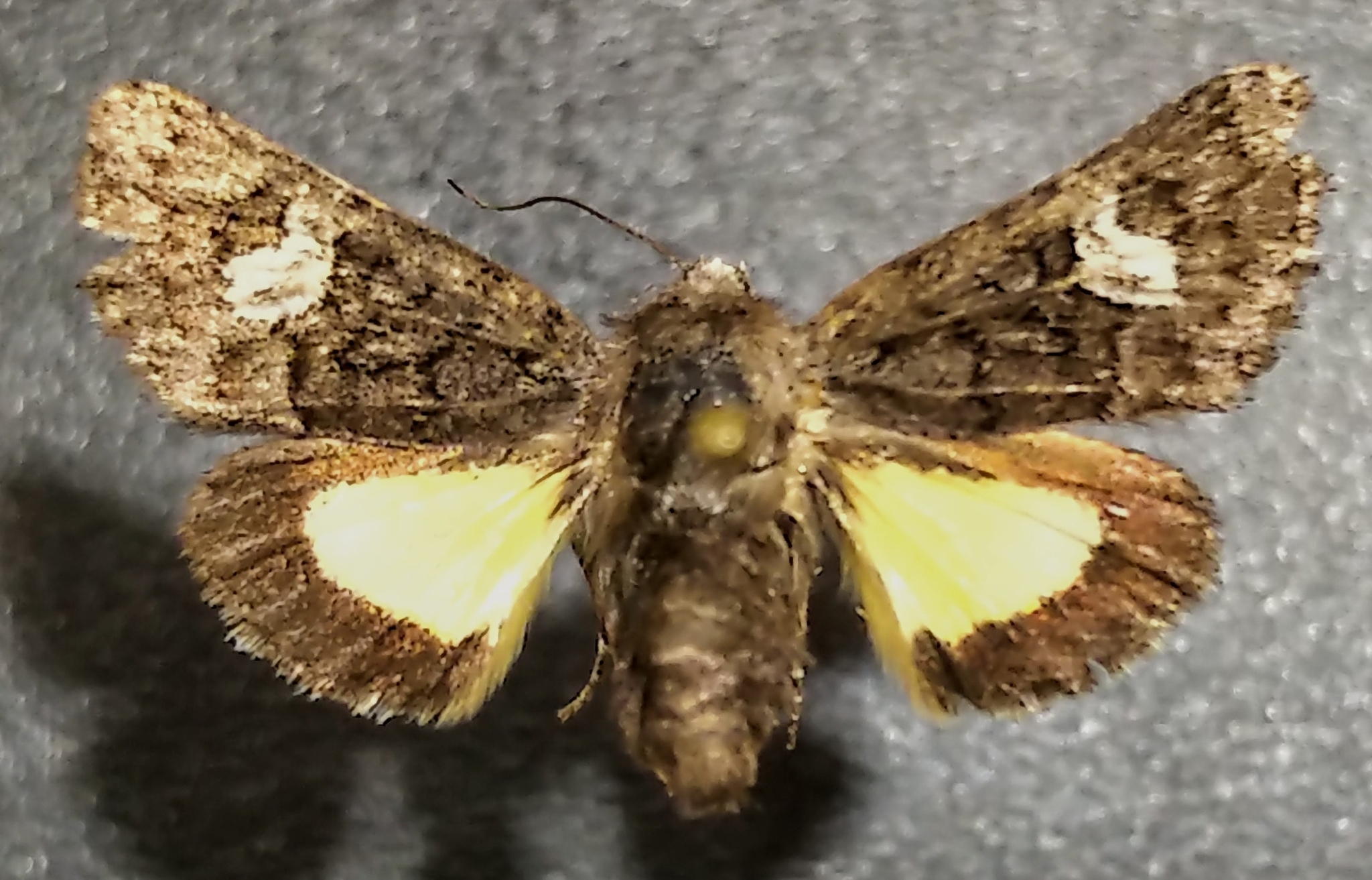
- Coranarta macrostigma

Scientific classification
- Domain: Eukaryota
- Kingdom: Animalia
- Phylum: Arthropoda
- Class: Insecta
- Order: Lepidoptera
- Superfamily: Noctuoidea
- Family: Noctuidae
- Tribe: Hadenini
- Genus: Coranarta; Beck, 1991

= Coranarta =

Genus of moths

Coranarta is a genus of moths in the family Noctuidae.

== Species ==
- Coranarta carbonaria (Christoph, 1893)
- Coranarta cordigera (Thunberg, 1792)
- Coranarta luteola (Grote & Robinson, 1865)
- Coranarta macrostigma (Lafontaine & Mikkola, 1987)
- Coranarta restricta Yela, 2002
