= Gallowaya =

Scientific classification
- Kingdom: Fungi
- Division: Basidiomycota
- Class: Pucciniomycetes
- Order: Pucciniales
- Family: Coleosporiaceae
- Genus: Gallowaya; Arthur (1906)

Type species
- Gallowaya pinicola Arthur (1921)

Species
- Gallowaya crowellii (Cummins) Thirum. (1950); Gallowaya pinicola Arthur (1921)

Genus of fungi

Gallowaya is a genus of rust fungi in the family Coleosporiaceae. The genus contains two species that grow on pines species in North America and Siberia.
