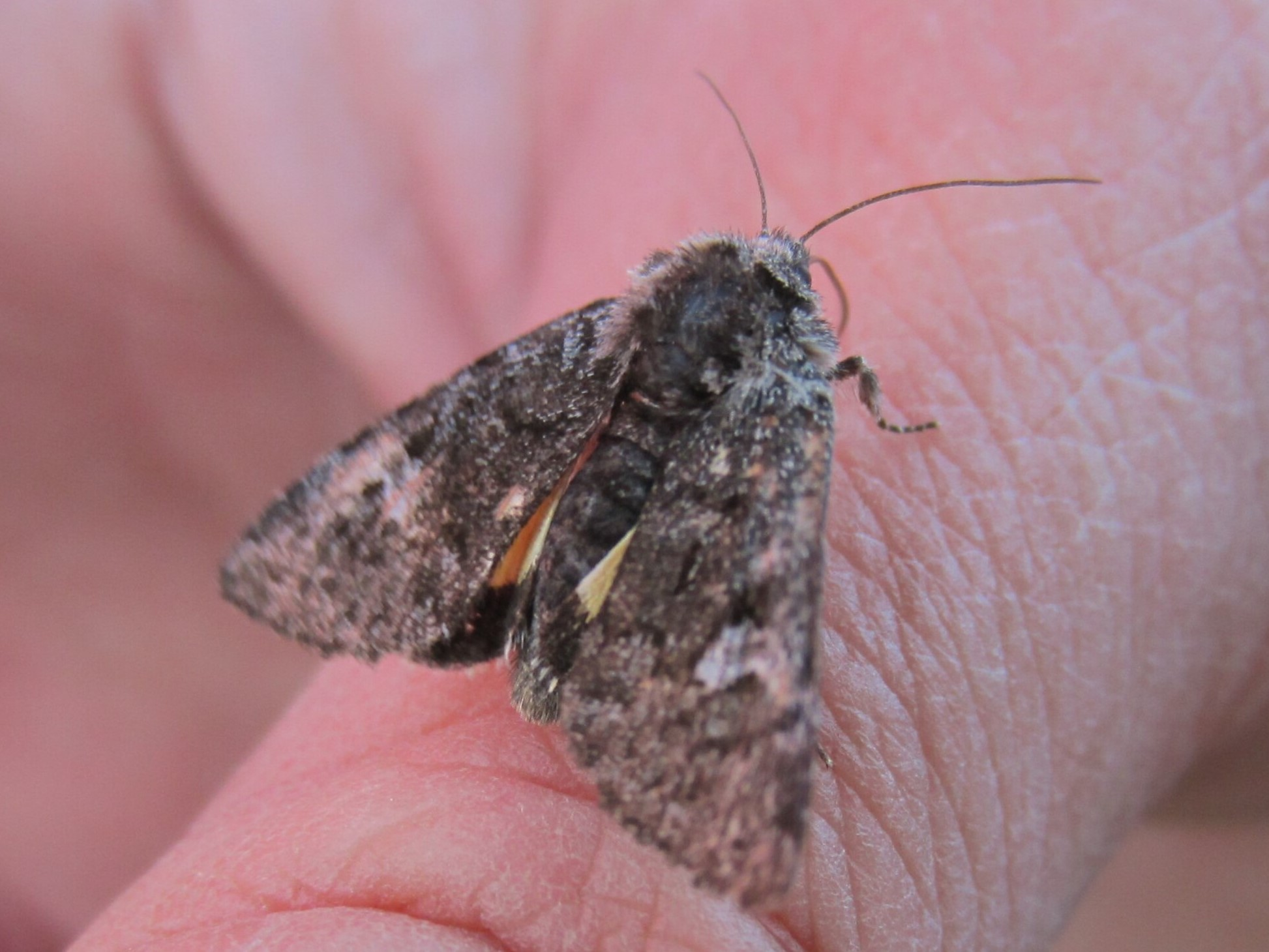

Scientific classification
- Kingdom: Animalia
- Phylum: Arthropoda
- Class: Insecta
- Order: Lepidoptera
- Superfamily: Noctuoidea
- Family: Noctuidae
- Genus: Coranarta
- Species: C. luteola

Binomial name
- Coranarta luteola (Grote & Robinson, 1865)

Synonyms
- Anarta luteola Grote & Robinson, 1865

= Coranarta luteola =

Species of moth

Coranarta luteola is a moth of the family Noctuidae described by Augustus Radcliffe Grote and Coleman Townsend Robinson in 1865. It is found in the boreal zone of North America, from Alaska to Labrador. Its range extends south to Minnesota and Wisconsin in the Midwest and to Maine in the east. In the Rocky Mountains, it extends as far south as Colorado. It is listed as endangered in the US state of Connecticut.

The length of the forewings is 11–12 mm.

The larvae feed on laurels (including Kalmia microphylla and Kalmia polifolia). Adults feed on flowers, and are particularly fond of Andromeda polifolia.
