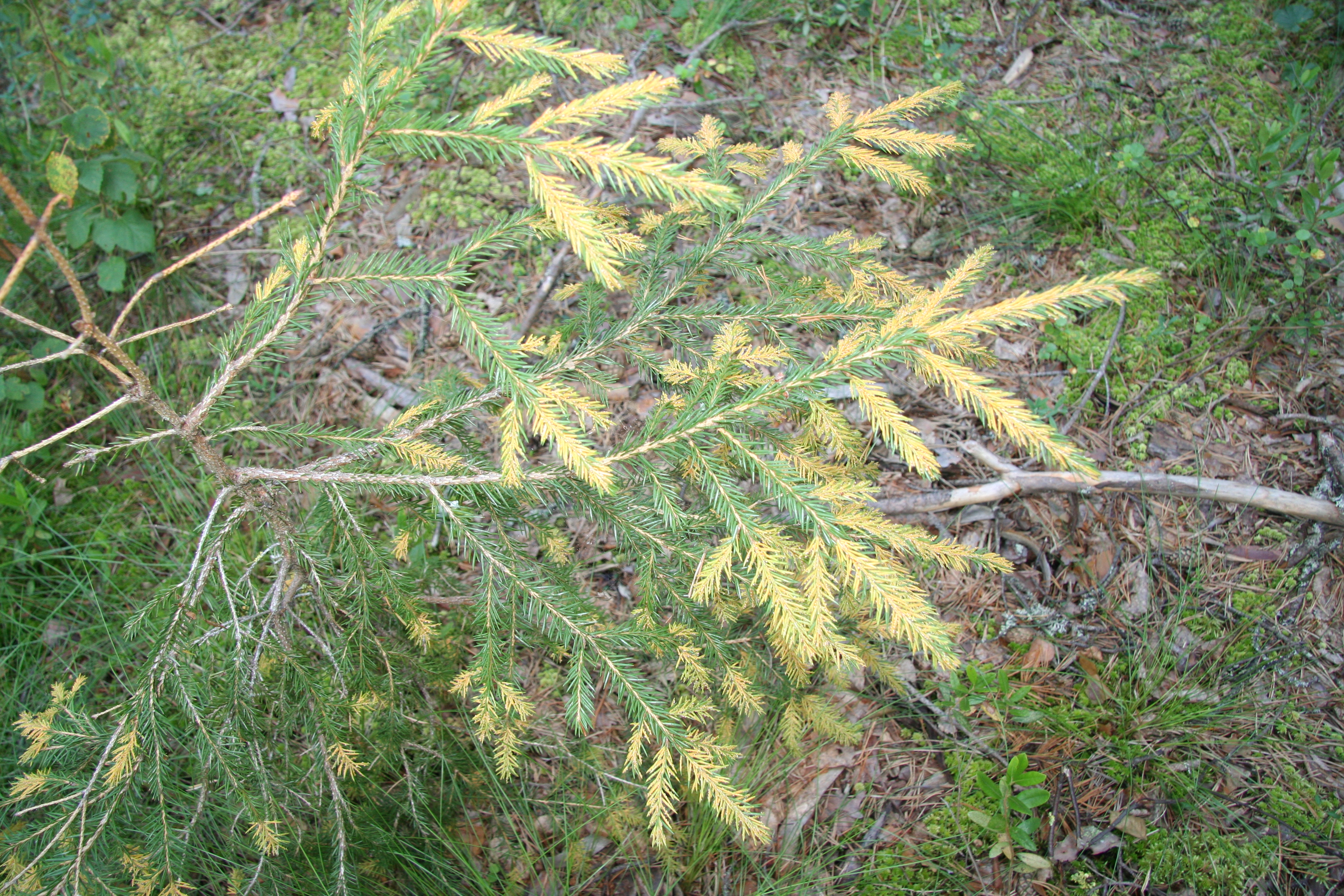
- Young Picea abies infected by Chrysomyxa ledi needle rust.

Scientific classification
- Domain: Eukaryota
- Kingdom: Fungi
- Division: Basidiomycota
- Class: Pucciniomycetes
- Order: Pucciniales
- Family: Coleosporiaceae
- Genus: Chrysomyxa
- Species: C. ledi

Binomial name
- Chrysomyxa ledi de Bary

Varieties
- Chrysomyxa ledi var. rhododendri

= Chrysomyxa ledi =

Species of fungus

Chrysomyxa ledi is a fungus. It occurs in Eurasia throughout the range of its broad-leaved hosts. The aecial stage is found on native and exotic spruces in Europe, including white and Engelmann spruces.
