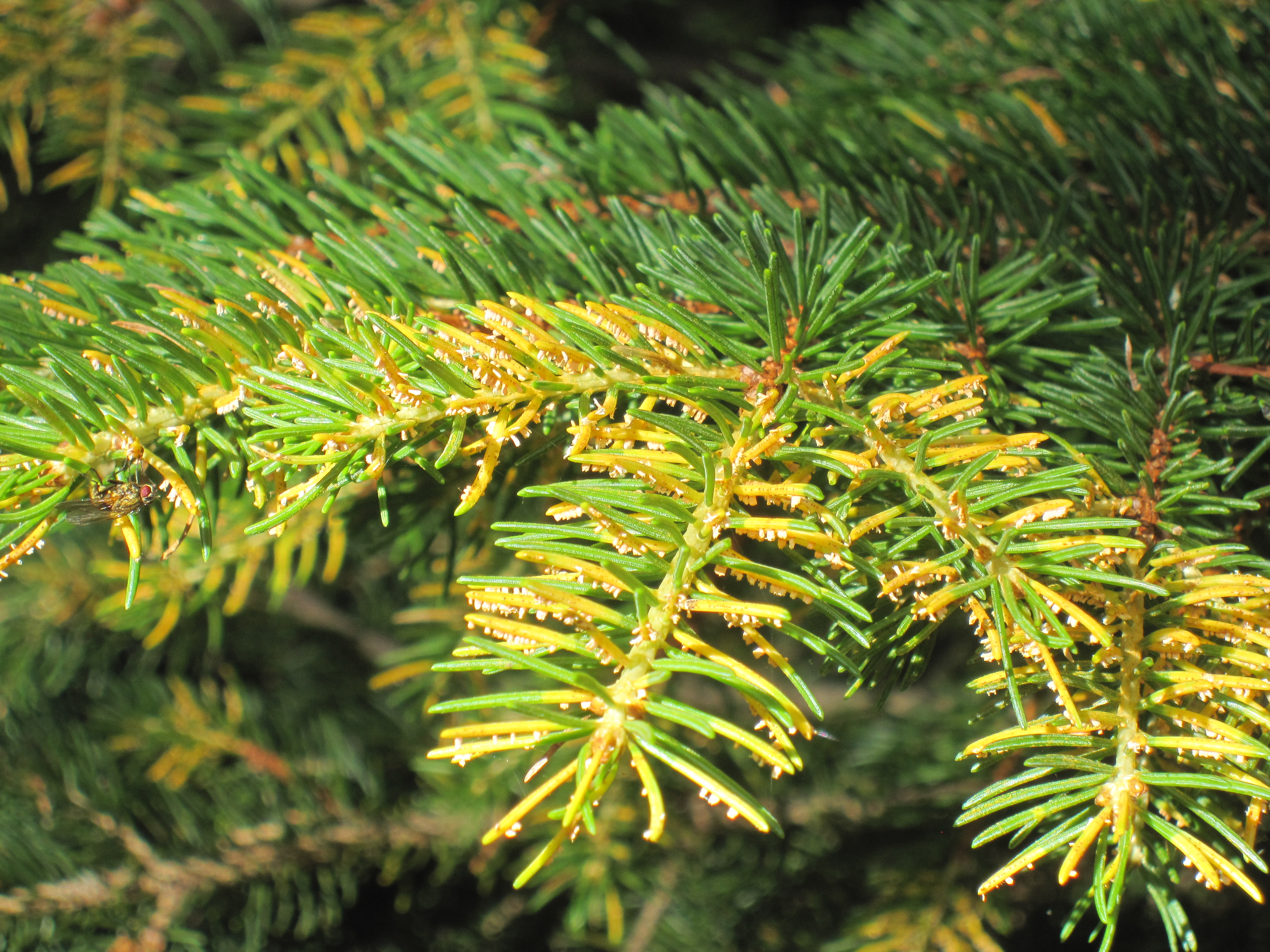
- On Norway spruce

Scientific classification
- Domain: Eukaryota
- Kingdom: Fungi
- Division: Basidiomycota
- Class: Pucciniomycetes
- Order: Pucciniales
- Family: Coleosporiaceae
- Genus: Chrysomyxa
- Species: C. ledi
- Variety: C. l. var. rhododendri

Trinomial name
- Chrysomyxa ledi var. rhododendri (DC.) Savile (1955)

Synonyms
- Uredo rhododendri DC. (1815); Chrysomyxa rhododendri (DC.) de Bary (1879)

= Chrysomyxa ledi var. rhododendri =

Species of fungus

Chrysomyxa ledi var. rhododendri is a plant pathogen responsible for the disease spruce needle rust.

It is present in European mountains, and especially in Switzerland in Grisons and Ticino between 1,000 and 2,000 metres.

The spores of the fungus hibernate on Rhododendron species. In spring and summer, it migrates to spruce and infects recently emerged needles, coloring them in yellow. In autumn, the spores that developed on spruce infects the rhododendron again.
