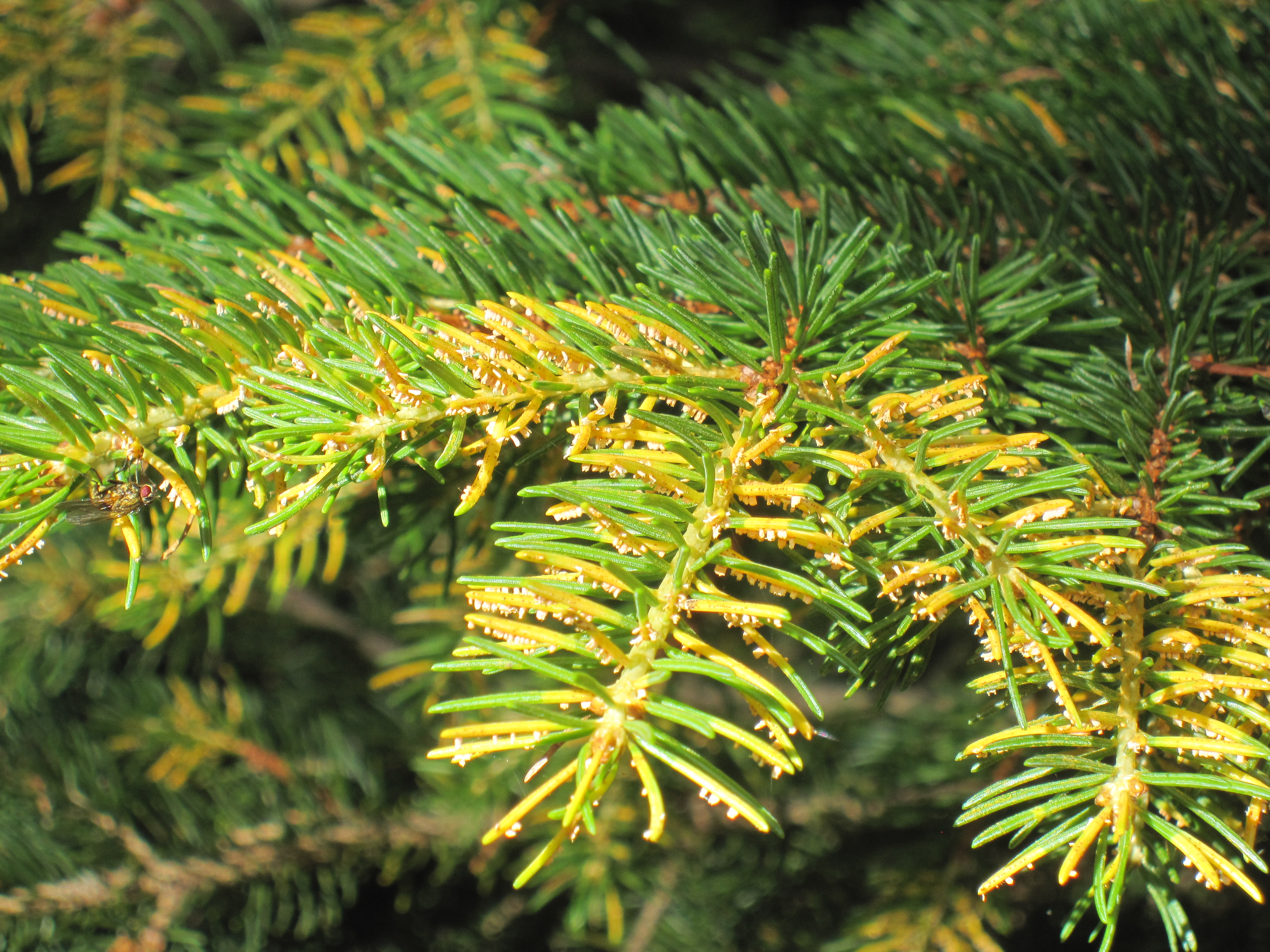
- Chrysomyxa rhododendri on Norway spruce

Scientific classification
- Domain: Eukaryota
- Kingdom: Fungi
- Division: Basidiomycota
- Class: Pucciniomycetes
- Order: Pucciniales
- Family: Coleosporiaceae
- Genus: Chrysomyxa; Unger (1840)

Type species
- Chrysomyxa abietis (Wallr.) Unger (1840)

Species
- See text

Synonyms
- Barclayella Dietel (1890); Melampsoropsis (J.Schröt.) Arthur (1906); Stilbechrysomyxa M.M.Chen

= Chrysomyxa =

Genus of fungi

Chrysomyxa is a genus of rust fungi in the family Coleosporiaceae. The genus, widespread in the Northern Hemisphere, contains about 23 species. Rust fungi in the genus Chrysomyxa occur in boreal forests of the northern hemisphere on Pinaceae, (mostly Picea), and most species alternate to angiosperm hosts in the Ericaceae.

== Species ==
As accepted by Species Fungorum;

- Chrysomyxa abietis (Wallr.) Unger (1840)
- Chrysomyxa arctostaphyli Dietel (1894)
- Chrysomyxa bombacis Petch (1917)
- Chrysomyxa butleri Syd. & P. Syd. (1912)
- Chrysomyxa cassandrae (Gobi) Tranzschel (1893)
- Chrysomyxa chiogenis Dietel (1894)
- Chrysomyxa deformans (Dietel) Jacz. (1926)
- Chrysomyxa diebuensis C.J. You & J. Cao (2017)
- Chrysomyxa dietelii Syd. & P. Syd. (1907)
- Chrysomyxa empetri (Pers.) J. Schröt. (1887)
- Chrysomyxa empetri J. Schröt. ex Cummins (1956)
- Chrysomyxa himalensis Barclay (1890)
- Chrysomyxa ilicina (Ellis & Everh.) Arthur (1934)
- Chrysomyxa jinghongensis P. Zhao & L. Cai (2021)
- Chrysomyxa keteleeriae (F.L. Tai) Y.C. Wang & R.S. Peterson (1982)
- Chrysomyxa komarovii Tranzschel (1939)
- Chrysomyxa ledi (Alb. & Schwein.) de Bary (1879)
- Chrysomyxa ledicola (Peck) Lagerh. (1894)
- Chrysomyxa menziesiae Dietel (1903)
- Chrysomyxa nagodhii P.E. Crane (2001)
- Chrysomyxa neoglandulosi P.E. Crane (2001)
- Chrysomyxa perlaria B. Li (1987)
- Chrysomyxa piperiana (Arthur) Sacc. & Trotter (1912)
- Chrysomyxa purpurea (C.J. You & J. Cao) P. Zhao & L. Cai (2021)
- Chrysomyxa qilianensis Y.C. Wang, X.B. Wu & B. Li (1987)
- Chrysomyxa reticulata P.E. Crane (2001)
- Chrysomyxa rhododendri (DC.) de Bary (1879)
- Chrysomyxa rhododendri-capitati (Z.M. Cao & Z.Qi Li) C.J. You & C.M. Tian (2019)
- Chrysomyxa roanensis (Arthur) Arthur (1934)
- Chrysomyxa spinulospora (P.E. Crane) C.J. You & C.M. Tian (2019)
- Chrysomyxa stilbae Y.Z. Wang, M.M. Chen & L. Guo (1980)
- Chrysomyxa succinea (Sacc.) Tranzschel (1939)
- Chrysomyxa taghishae Balf.-Browne (1955)
- Chrysomyxa taihaensis Hirats. f. & Hashioka (1935)
- Chrysomyxa tsugae-yunnanensis Teng (1947)
- Chrysomyxa tsukubaensis (P.E. Crane, Yamaoka, Engkhan. & Kakish.) C.J. You & C.M. Tian (2019)
- Chrysomyxa vaccinii (Ziller) P.E. Crane (2001)
- Chrysomyxa vitis E.J. Butler (1912)
- Chrysomyxa woroninii Tranzschel (1903)
- Chrysomyxa yunnanensis (P.E. Crane) C.J. You & C.M. Tian (2019)

Former species;

- C. albida J.G. Kühn (1883) = Kuehneola uredinis, Phragmidiaceae
- C. aliena Syd., P. Syd. & E.J. Butler (1912) = Phragmidiella aliena, Phakopsoraceae
- C. alpina Hirats. f. (1929) = Chrysomyxa succinea
- C. bambusae Teng (1938) = Kweilingia bambusae, Phakopsoraceae
- C. dumeticola (P.E. Crane) C.J. You & C.M. Tian (2019) = Uredo dumeticola, Pucciniaceae
- C. expansa Dietel (1900) = Chrysomyxa succinea
- C. farlowii (Arthur) Sacc. & Traverso (1910) = Melampsora farlowii, Melampsoraceae
- C. ledi var. cassandrae (Peck & Clinton) Savile (1950) = Chrysomyxa cassandrae
- C. ledi var. rhododendri (DC.) Savile (1950) = Chrysomyxa rhododendri
- C. ledi var. vaccinii Ziller (1955) = Chrysomyxa vaccinii
- C. monesis Ziller (1954) = Rossmanomyces monesis, Coleosporiaceae
- C. peregrina Syd., P. Syd. & E.J. Butler (1912) = Cerotelium peregrinum, Phakopsoraceae
- C. piceae Barclay (1891) = Ceropsora piceae, Coleosporiaceae
- C. pyrolae Rostr. (1881) = Rossmanomyces pyrolae, Coleosporiaceae
- C. pyrolae var. pyrolata (Schwein.) Jørst. (1935) = Rossmanomyces pyrolae, Coleosporiaceae
- C. pyrolata (Körn.) G. Winter (1881) = Rossmanomyces pyrolae, Coleosporiaceae
- C. ramischiae Lagerh. (1909) = Rossmanomyces ramischiae, Coleosporiaceae
- C. simplex (Dietel) Thirum. (1961) = Coleopucciniella simplex, Pucciniaceae
- C. tsugae Hirats. f. (1937) = Hiratsukaia tsugae, Coleosporiaceae
- C. tsugae Teng (1940) = Chrysomyxa tsugae-yunnanensis
- C. urediniformis Müll. Hal. (1886) = Mainsia urediniformis, Phragmidiaceae
- C. weirii H.S. Jacks. (1917) = Ceropsora weirii, Coleosporiaceae
- C. zhuoniensis C.J. You & J. Cao (2017) = Chrysomyxa succinea
