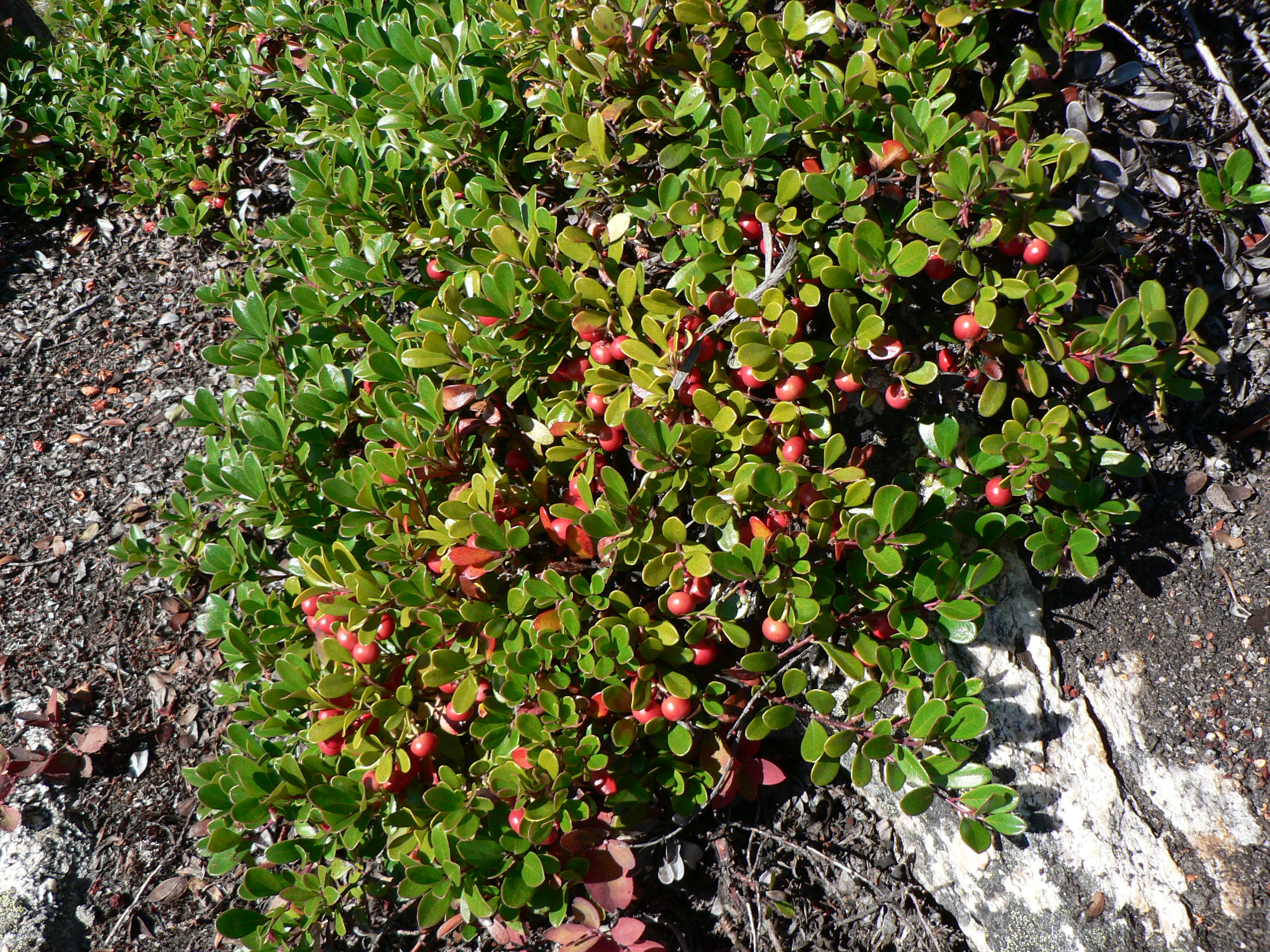

Conservation status
- Secure (NatureServe)

Scientific classification
- Kingdom: Plantae
- Clade: Embryophytes
- Clade: Tracheophytes
- Clade: Spermatophytes
- Clade: Angiosperms
- Clade: Eudicots
- Clade: Asterids
- Order: Ericales
- Family: Ericaceae
- Genus: Arctostaphylos
- Species: A. uva-ursi

Binomial name
- Arctostaphylos uva-ursi (L.) Spreng.

Synonyms
- List: Arbutus acerba Gilib. (1782); Arbutus buxifolia Stokes (1812); Arbutus officinalis Boiss. (1875); Arbutus procumbens Salisb. (1796); Arbutus uva-ursi L. (1753); Arctostaphylos adenotricha (Fernald & J.F.Macbr.) Á.Löve, D.Löve & B.M.Kapoor (1972); Arctostaphylos alpina Payot (1882); Arctostaphylos angustifolia Payot (1882); Arctostaphylos crassifolia (Braun-Blanq.) Rivas Mart. (2011); Arctostaphylos officinalis Wimm. & Grab. (1827); Arctostaphylos procumbens Patze, E.Mey. & Elkan (1849); Arctostaphylos uva-ursi subsp. adenotricha (Fernald & J.F.Macbr.) Calder & Roy L.Taylor (1965); Arctostaphylos uva-ursi subsp. coactilis (Fernald & J.F.Macbr.) Á.Löve, D.Löve & B.M.Kapoor (1971); Arctostaphylos uva-ursi subsp. crassifolia Rivas Mart. (1963); Arctostaphylos uva-ursi subsp. crassifolius (Braun-Blanq.) Rivas Mart. ex Torre, Alcaraz & M.B.Crespo (1995); Arctostaphylos uva-ursi subsp. longipilosa Packer & Denford (1974); Arctostaphylos uva-ursi subsp. monoensis Roof (1980); Arctostaphylos uva-ursi subsp. stipitata Packer & Denford (1974); Daphnidostaphylis fendleriana Klotzsch (1851); Mairania uva-ursi (L.) Desv. (1813); Mairrania uva-ursi (L.) Desv. (1813); Uva-ursi buxifolia Gray (1821); Uva-ursi procumbens Moench (1794); Uva-ursi uva-ursi (L.) Cockerell ex Daniels (1911)

= Arctostaphylos uva-ursi =

Species of fruit and plant

Arctostaphylos uva-ursi is a plant species of the genus Arctostaphylos widely distributed across circumboreal regions of the subarctic Northern Hemisphere. Kinnikinnick (from the Unami language for smoking "mixture") is a common name in Canada and the United States. Growing up to 30 centimetres (12 inches) in height, the leaves are evergreen. The flowers are white to pink and the fruit is a red berry.

One of several related species referred to as bearberry, its specific epithet uva-ursi means "grape of the bear" in Latin, similar to the meaning of the generic epithet Arctostaphylos (Greek for "bear grapes").

== Description ==
Arctostaphylos uva-ursi is a small procumbent woody groundcover shrub growing to 5–30 centimetres (2–12 inches) high. Wild stands of the species can be dense, with heights rarely taller than 15 cm (6 in). Erect branching twigs emerge from long flexible prostrate stems, which are produced by single roots. The trailing stems will layer, sending out small roots periodically. The finely textured velvety branches are initially white to pale green, becoming smooth and red-brown with maturity. The small solitary three-scaled buds are dark brown.

The leaves are shiny, small, and feel thick and stiff, measuring about 4 cm (1 1/2 in) long and 1 cm (1/2 in) wide. Their tops are darker green than their undersides. They have rounded tips tapering back to the base, held vertically by a twisted leaf stalk in an alternate arrangement on the stem. The leaves remain green for 1–3 years before falling in autumn, when their colour changes to a reddish-green or purple, pale on the underside.

Terminal clusters of small urn-shaped flowers bloom from May to June. The flowers are white to pink, and bear round, fleshy or mealy, bright red to pink fruits called drupes. The smooth, glossy skinned fruits range from 1/4 to 1/2 inch (6 to 13 mm) in diameter. The red fruits persist on the plant into early winter. The fruits are bittersweet when raw, but sweeter when boiled and dried. Each drupe contains 1 to 5 hard seeds, which need to be scarified and stratified prior to germination to reduce the seed coat and break embryo dormancy. There is an average of 40,900 cleaned seeds per pound.

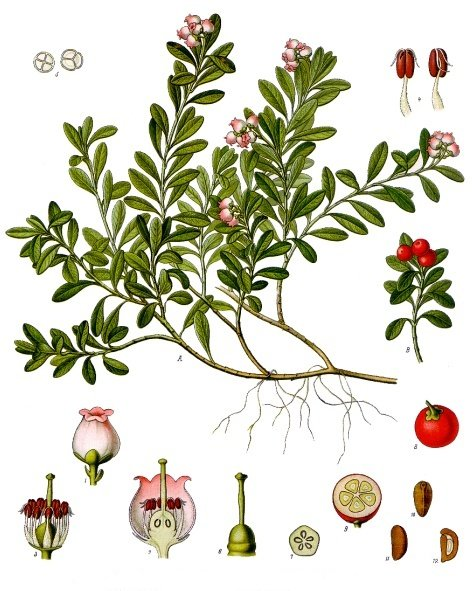
Illustration from Köhler's Medicinal Plants (1887)

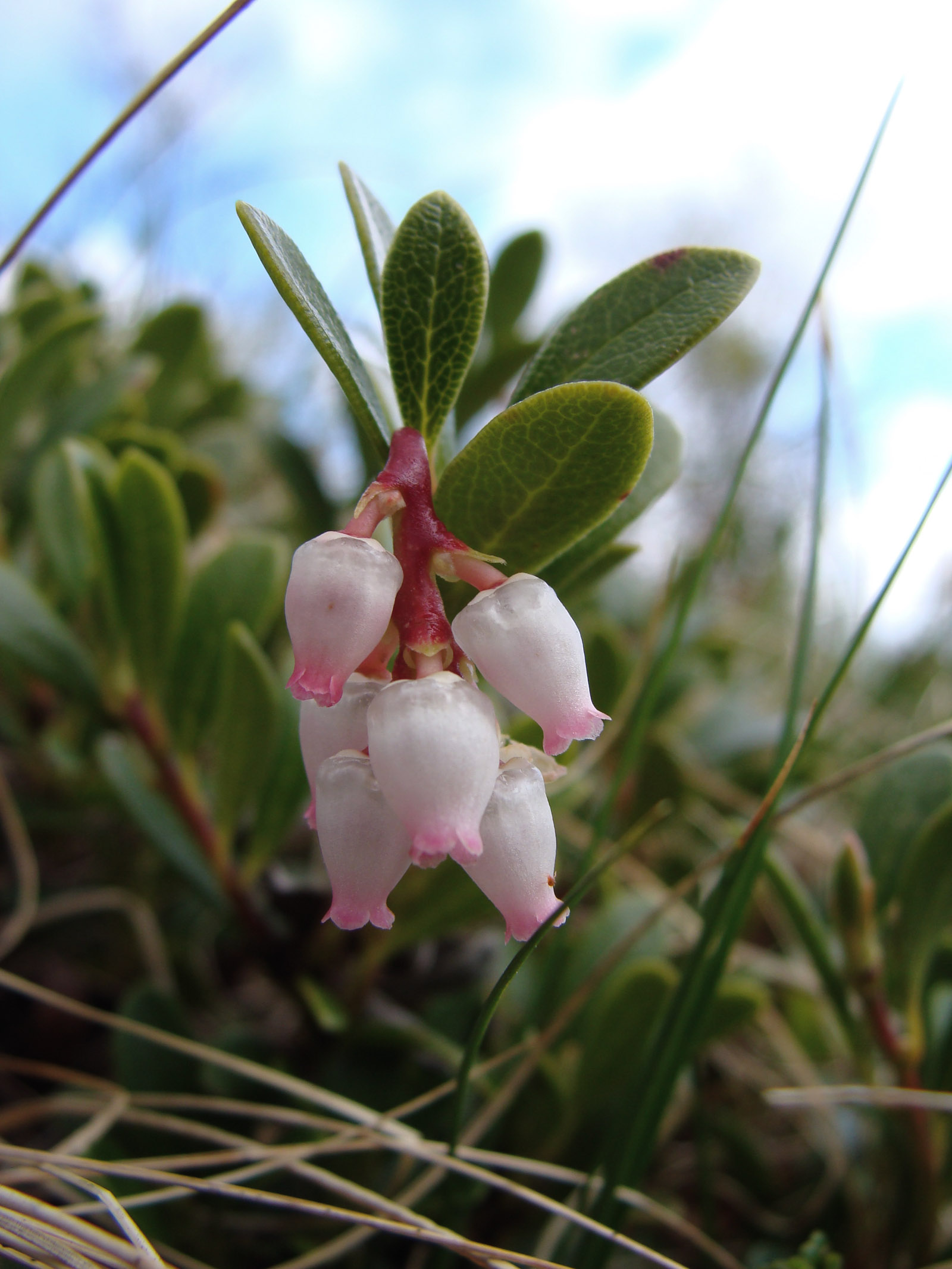
Flowers

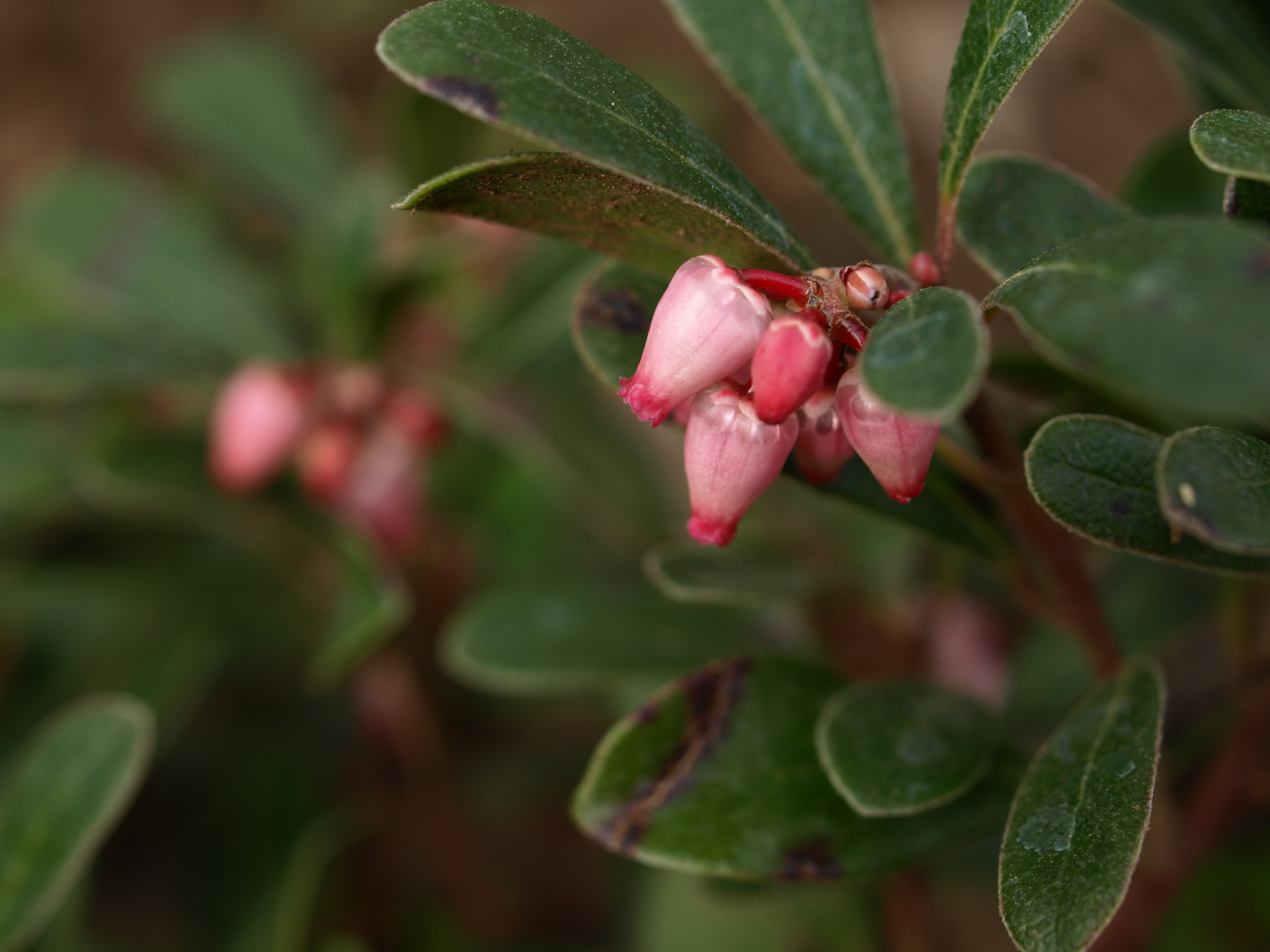
Flowers

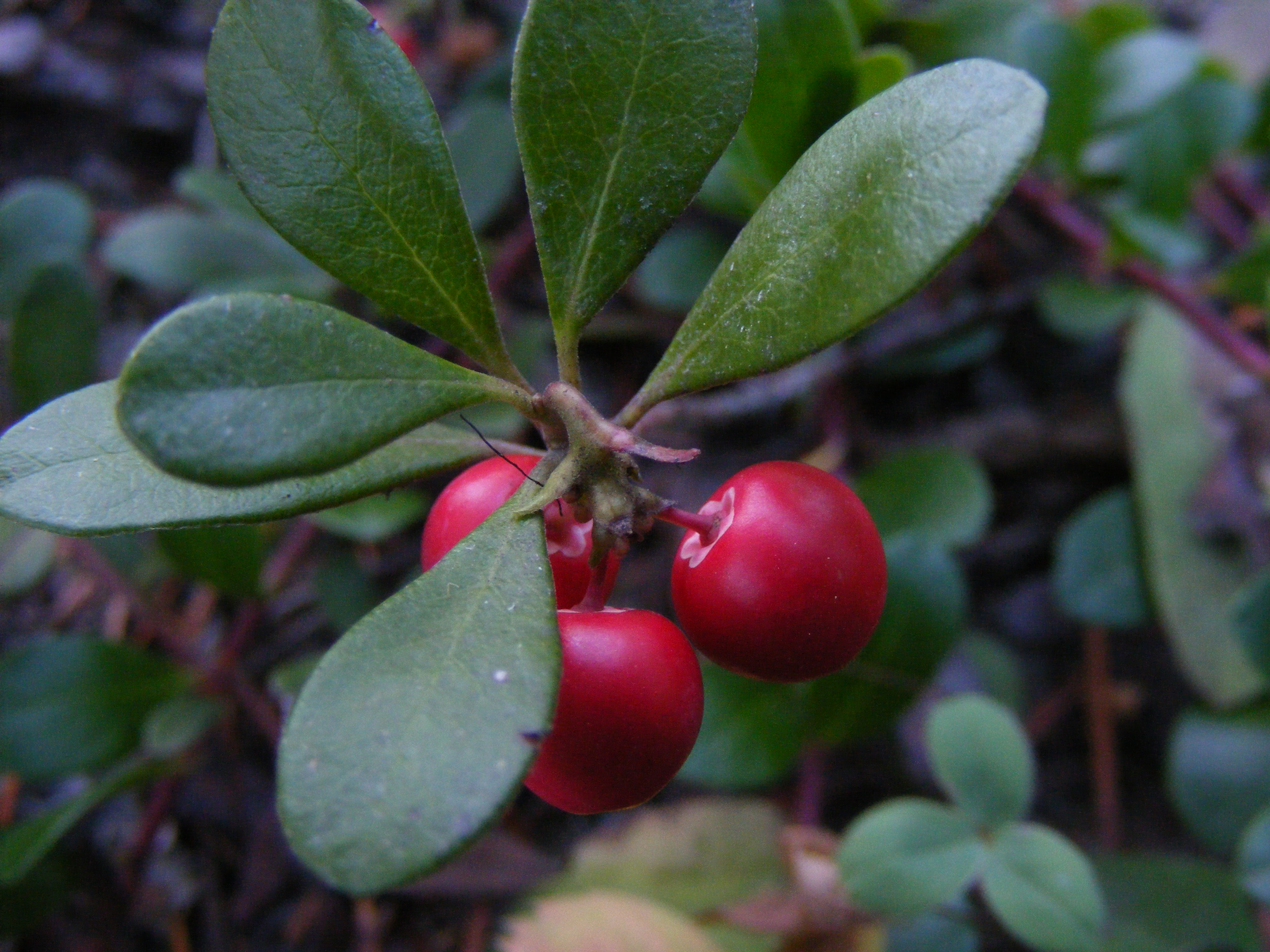
A. uva-ursi subsp. uva-ursi fruit

=== Chemistry ===
The plant contains diverse phytochemicals, including ursolic acid, tannic acid, gallic acid, some essential oils and resin, hydroquinones (mainly arbutin, up to 17%), tannins (up to 15%), phenolic glycosides and flavonoids.

== Subspecies ==
As many as 14 subspecies have been accepted, however as of 2024 they are considered synonyms by major sources such as Plants of the World Online and World Flora Online.

== Etymology ==
The genus name of Arctostaphylos uva-ursi comes from the Greek words arctos (meaning bear) and staphyle (meaning "bunch of grapes") in reference to the fruits which form grape-like clusters. In the wild, the fruits are commonly eaten by bears. The specific epithet, uva-ursi, comes from the Latin words uva (meaning grape) and ursus (bear), reflected by the bearberry nickname.

The common name, kinnikinnick, is an Algonquin word meaning "smoking mixture". Native Americans and early pioneers smoked the dried uva-ursi leaves and bark alone or mixed with other herbs, tobacco or dried dogwood bark in pipes. Numerous common names exist, depending on region, such as mealberry, sandberry, mountain-box, fox-plum, hog-crawberry, and barren myrtle.

== Distribution and habitat ==
The distribution of Arctostaphylos uva-ursi is circumpolar, and it is widespread in northern latitudes, but confined to high altitudes further south:

- in Europe, from Iceland and North Cape, Norway south to southern Spain (Sierra Nevada); central Italy (Apennines) and northern Greece (Pindus mountains);
- in Asia from arctic Siberia south to Turkey, the Caucasus, the Levant and the Himalaya;
- in North America from arctic Alaska, Canada and Greenland, south to California, north coast, central High Sierra Nevada (above Convict Lake, Mono County, California), Central Coast, California, San Francisco Bay Area, to New Mexico in the Rocky Mountains; and the Appalachian Mountains in the northeast United States. It is prevalent across all regions of British Columbia and Alberta.

== Ecology ==
It is a fire-tolerant species and may be a seedbanking species.

Arctostaphylos uva-ursi is an alternate host for spruce broom rust.

Bears and other animals eat the berries.

== Conservation ==
The plant is rare or endangered in several states of the Midwestern United States.

== Toxicity ==
One review indicated that ingestion of large doses can cause allergic reactions, with nausea and seizures, as a potential emergency condition. Preliminary studies indicate that arbutin may be toxic when ingested in high doses. Uva ursi may cause adverse effects in people with liver or kidney disease, or pregnant and breastfeeding women.

The leaves contain arbutin, which metabolizes to form hydroquinone, a potential liver toxin.

== Uses ==
Bearberry fruits and leaves are used by members of the Blackfeet Nation as food. While edible raw, the fruits are fairly bland that way, but can be used to make jelly. The berries were used as seasoning and cooked with meat. The young leaves can be made into tea. Teas and extracts of the leaves have been used in traditional medicine of First Nations people over centuries as urinary tract antiseptics, diuretics, and laxatives. In herbalism, leaf tea is used to treat urinary tract inflammation. Though thought to be an astringent or cure for sexually transmitted diseases, as of 2017, there was no high-quality evidence from clinical research that such treatments are effective or safe.

Dried bearberry leaves are the main component in many traditional North American Native smoking mixes, known collectively as "kinnikinnick" (Algonquin for "smoking mixture") used especially among western First Nations, often including other herbs and sometimes tobacco.

Indigenous peoples also used the plant to make yellow dye.

There are several cultivars that are propagated for use as ornamental plants. It is an attractive year-round evergreen groundcover for gardens, and is useful for controlling erosion on hillsides and slopes due to its deep roots. It is tolerant of sun and dry soils, and is thus common groundcover in urban areas, in naturalized areas, and in native plant or rock gardens. As the seeds are difficult to germinate they are most often propagated using rooted stems.
