= Ceropsora =

Scientific classification
- Kingdom: Fungi
- Division: Basidiomycota
- Class: Pucciniomycetes
- Order: Pucciniales
- Family: Coleosporiaceae
- Genus: Ceropsora; B.K.Bakshi & Suj.Singh (1960)

Type species
- Ceropsora piceae (Barclay) B.K. Bakshi & Suj. Singh (1960)

Genus of fungi

Ceropsora is a genus of rust fungus in the family Coleosporiaceae.

The genus was thought to be monotypic, containing the single species Ceropsora piceae, found growing on spruce in India. Until 2020, when Ceropsora weirii (H.S. Jacks.) Aime & McTaggart (2020) was published. It was formerly published as Chrysomyxa weirii H.S. Jacks., Phytopathology 7: 353 in 1917.
