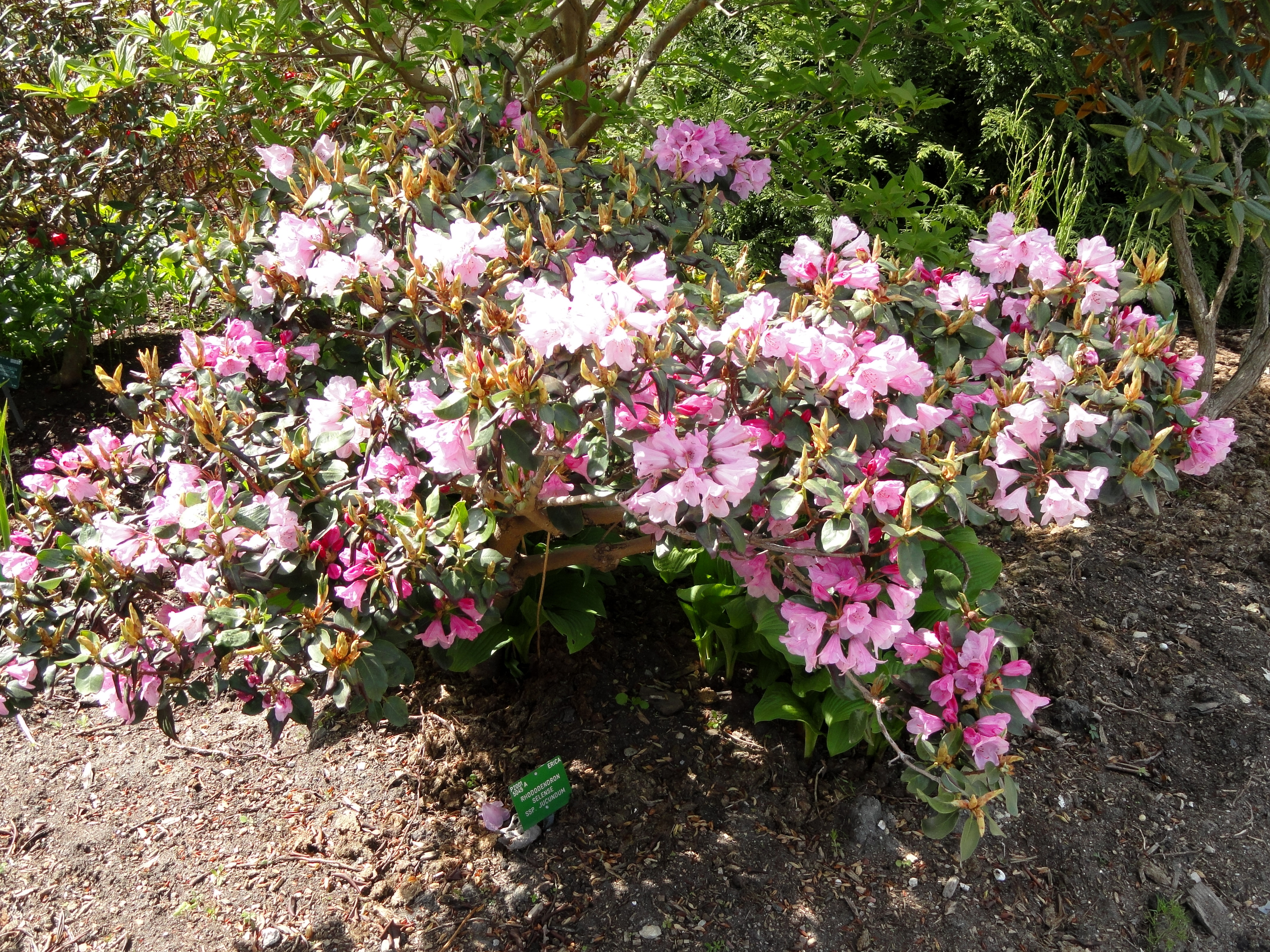
- Rhododendron selense ssp. jucundum

Scientific classification
- Kingdom: Plantae
- Clade: Tracheophytes
- Clade: Angiosperms
- Clade: Eudicots
- Clade: Asterids
- Order: Ericales
- Family: Ericaceae
- Genus: Rhododendron
- Species: R. selense

Binomial name
- Rhododendron selense Franch.

Subspecies
- See text.

Synonyms
- Of R. selense subsp. dasycladum: Rhododendron dasycladum Balf.f. & W.W.Sm.; Rhododendron dolerum Balf.f. & Forrest; Rhododendron rhaibocarpum Balf.f. & W.W.Sm.; Of R. selense subsp. jucundum: Rhododendron jucundum Balf.f. & W.W.Sm.; Rhododendron blandulum Balf.f. & W.W.Sm.; Of R. selense subsp. selense: Rhododendron axium Balf.f. & Forrest; Rhododendron chalarocladum Balf.f. & Forrest; Rhododendron metrium Forrest; Rhododendron nanothamnum Balf.f. & Forrest; Rhododendron pagophyllum Balf.f. & Kingdon-Ward; Rhododendron probum Balf.f. & Forrest

= Rhododendron selense =

Species of plant

Rhododendron selense (多变杜鹃) is a rhododendron species native to southwestern Sichuan, eastern Xizang, and western Yunnan in China, where it grows at altitudes of 2,700–4,000 m (8,900–13,100 ft). It is an evergreen shrub that grows to 1–2 m (3.3–6.6 ft) in height, with leaves that are oblong-elliptic or obovate to elliptic, 4–8 by 2–4 cm in size. The flowers are pink.

It is best seen in its native habitat, where many thousands of plants can be seen flowering during April and May. In cultivation it takes several years to flower.

== Taxonomy ==
Rhododendron selense was first described by Adrien René Franchet in 1898.

=== Subspecies ===
Three subspecies are recognized:

- Rhododendron selense subsp. dasycladum (Balf.f. & W.W.Sm.) D.F.Chamb.
- Rhododendron selense subsp. jucundum (Balf.f. & W.W.Sm.) D.F.Chamb.
- Rhododendron selense subsp. selense

== Conservation ==
In 1998, Rhododendron dasycladum was assessed as "vulnerable" and said to be an endemic of a single mountain in Yunnan, China. As of February 2023, this species is regarded one of the synonyms of Rh. selense subsp. dasycladum, which has a much wider distribution in eastern Tibet, southwestern Sichuan and northwestern Yunnan.
