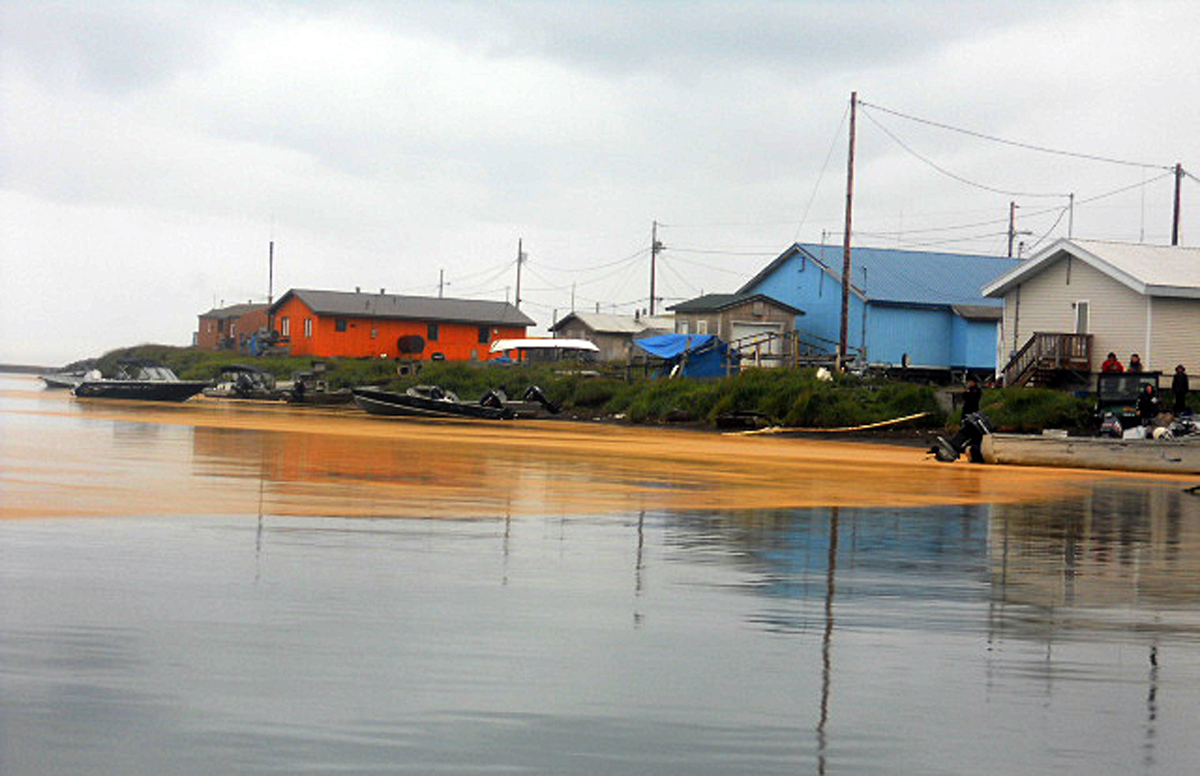
- Chrysomyxa ledicola as "orange goo" in Kivalina, Alaska

Scientific classification
- Kingdom: Fungi
- Division: Basidiomycota
- Class: Pucciniomycetes
- Order: Pucciniales
- Family: Coleosporiaceae; Dietel (1900)

Type genus
- Coleosporium Lév. (1847)

= Coleosporiaceae =

Family of fungi

The Coleosporiaceae are a family of rust fungi in the order Pucciniales. The family contains 6 genera and 131 species. It was updated in 2020, to 7 genera and 173 species.

== Genera ==
As accepted by Wijayawardene et al. 2020;

- Ceropsora B.K. Bakshi & Suj. Singh (2)
- Chrysomyxa Unger (38)
- Coleosporium Lév. (125)
- Diaphanopellis P.E. Crane (2)
- Gallowaya Arthur (3)
- Quasipucciniastrum X.H. Qi, P. Zhao & L. Cai (1)
- Rossmanomyces Aime & McTaggart (3)
