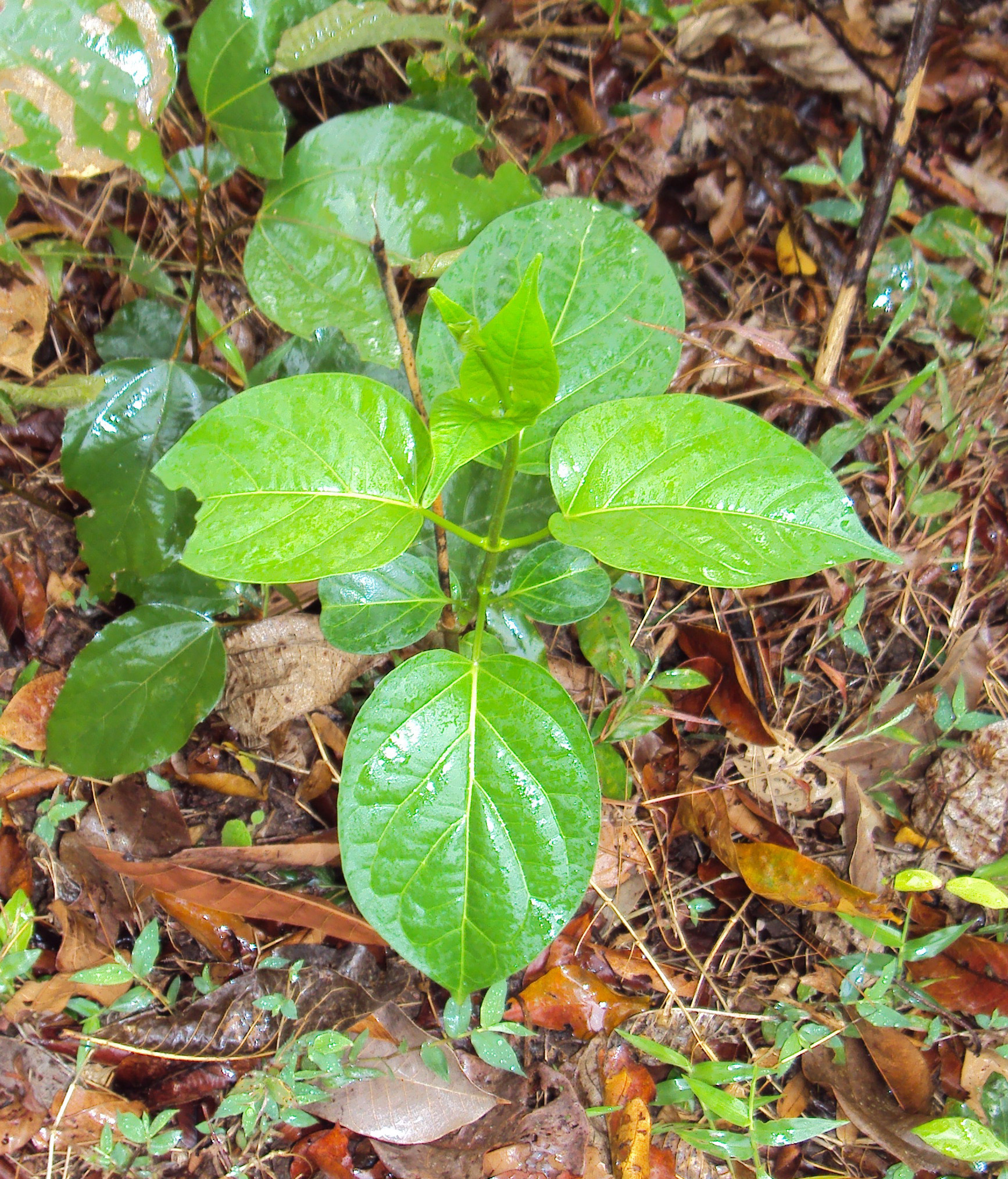
- Cosmostigma racemosum

Scientific classification
- Kingdom: Plantae
- Clade: Tracheophytes
- Clade: Angiosperms
- Clade: Eudicots
- Clade: Asterids
- Order: Gentianales
- Family: Apocynaceae
- Subfamily: Asclepiadoideae
- Tribe: Marsdenieae
- Genus: Cosmostigma; Wight

= Cosmostigma =

Genus of plants

Cosmostigma is a genus of plants in the family Apocynaceae, first described as a genus in 1834. It is native to tropical and subtropical Asia.

Species

1. Cosmostigma cordatum (Poir.) M.R.Almeida - India, Sri Lanka
2. Cosmostigma hainanense Tsiang - Hainan Province in China
3. Cosmostigma philippinense Schltr. - Philippines
