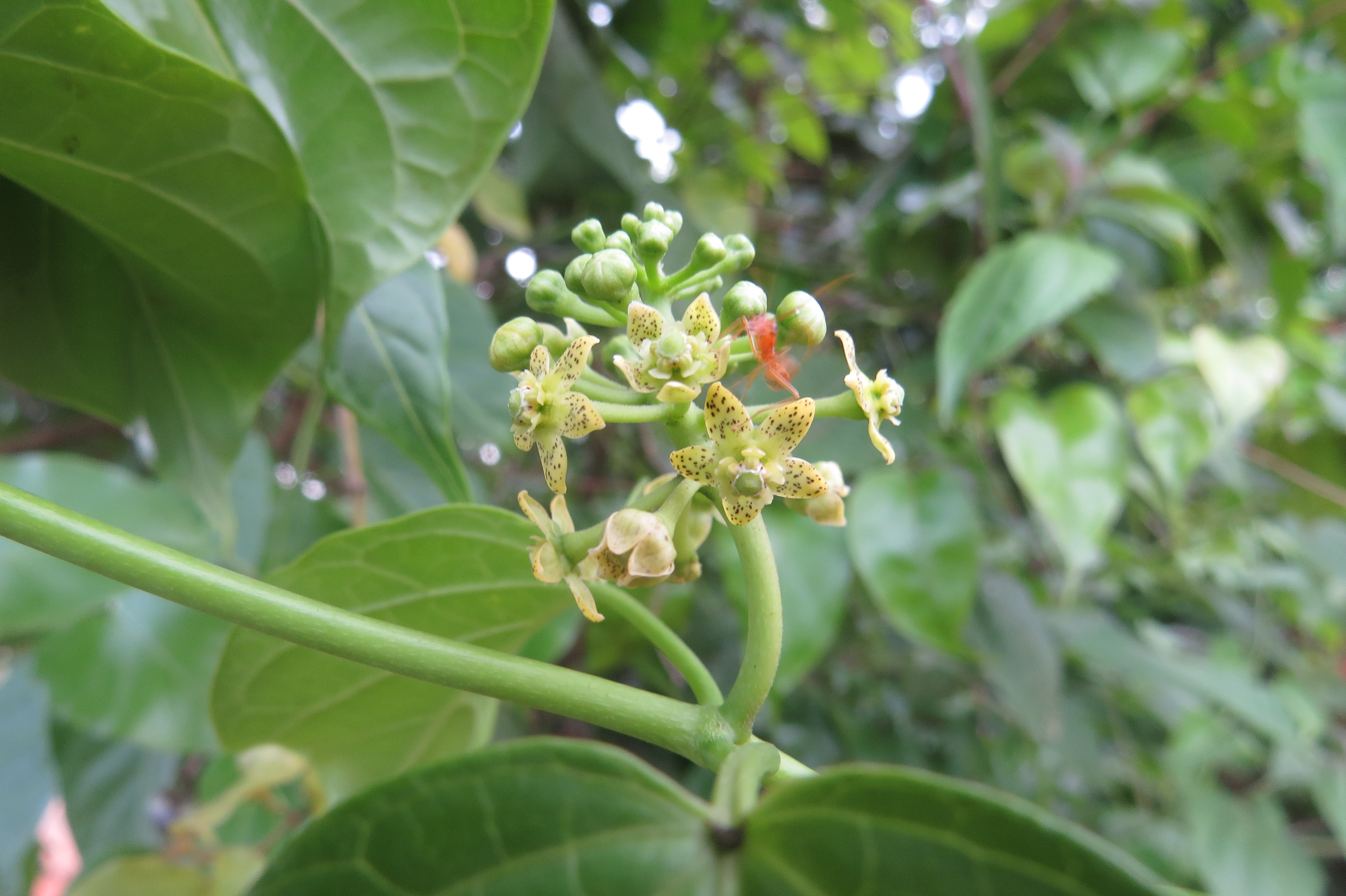

Scientific classification
- Kingdom: Plantae
- Clade: Tracheophytes
- Clade: Angiosperms
- Clade: Eudicots
- Clade: Asterids
- Order: Gentianales
- Family: Apocynaceae
- Genus: Cosmostigma
- Species: C. cordatum

Binomial name
- Cosmostigma cordatum (Poir.) M.R.Almeida

= Cosmostigma cordatum =

Species of plant

Cosmostigma cordatum, or green milkweed, is a species of flowering plant in the family Apocynaceae. It is native to India and Sri Lanka. It is a climbing herb growing in moist deciduous forests.

== Description ==
Cosmostigma cordatum has ovate leaves with rounded or subcordate bases. Flowers are greenish yellow with brown dots.

It is larval host plant of blue tiger and dark blue tiger butterflies.
