= List of Douglas-fir diseases =

This article is a list of diseases of Douglas-fir (Pseudotsuga menziezii).

== Fungal diseases ==
Fungal diseases
Annosus root disease	Heterobasidion annosum Spiniger meineckellum [anamorph]
Armillaria root disease	Armillaria solidipes Armillaria spp.
Black stain root disease	Leptographium wageneri var. pseudotsugae
Blue stain fungus	Grosmannia clavigera
Bleeding sap rot	Stereum sanguinolentum
Brown crumbly rot	Fomitopsis pinicola
Brown cubical rot	Laetiporus sulphureus
Brown trunk rot	Fomitopsis officinalis
Charcoal root disease	Macrophomina phaseolina
Conifer – aspen rust	Melampsora medusae
Conifer – cottonwood rust	Melampsora occidentalis
Cytospora canker	Leucostoma kunzei Cytospora kunzei [anamorph] Valsa abietis Cytospora abietis [anamorph]
Damping-off	Fusarium spp. Phytophthora spp. Pythium spp. Rhizoctonia spp.
Dermea canker	Dermea pseudotsugae
Dime canker	Durandiella pseudotsugae
Fusarium hypocotyl rot	Fusarium oxysporum
Gray-brown sap rot	Cryptoporus volvatus
Gray mold	Botrytis cinerea Botryotinia fuckelinana [teleomorph]
Laminated root rot	Phellinus weirii
Phoma seedling blight	Phoma eupyrena
Phomopsis canker	Diaporthe lokoyae Phomopsis lokoyae [anamorph]
Phytophthora root rot	Phytophthora spp.
Pitted sap rot	Trichaptum abietinum
Red-brown butt rot	Phaeolus schweinitzii
Red ring rot	Phellinus pini
Rhabdocline needle cast	Rhabdocline pseudotsugae Rhabdocline weirii
Rhizina root disease	Rhizina undulata
Rose fomes rot	Fomitopsis cajanderi
Rust-red stringy white rot	Echinodontium tinctorium
Sclerophoma dieback	Sydowia polyspora Sclerophoma pythiophila [anamorph] = Sclerophoma semenospora [anamorph]
Snow blight	Phacidium abietis
Snow/needle blight	Phacidium infestans
Sparrasis root rot	Sparrasis crispa
Stringy butt rot	Perenniporia subacida
Swiss needle cast	Nothophaeocryptopus gaeumannii
Tomentosus root rot	Inonotus tomentosus
Upper stem canker	Phoma eupyrena Fusarium avenaceum Fusarium sambucinum
White stringy rot	Resinicium bicolor
