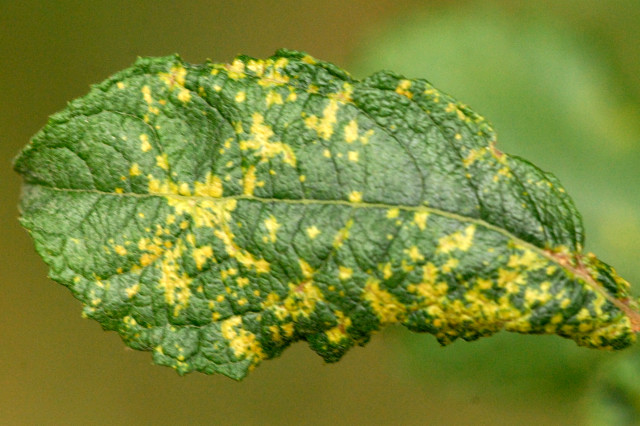

Scientific classification
- Domain: Eukaryota
- Kingdom: Fungi
- Division: Basidiomycota
- Class: Pucciniomycetes
- Order: Pucciniales
- Family: Melampsoraceae
- Genus: Melampsora
- Species: M. caprearum

Binomial name
- Melampsora caprearum Thüm. 1879

Synonyms
- Melampsora laricis-caprearum Klebahn, 1897

= Melampsora caprearum =

Species of fungus

Melampsora caprearum is a fungal pathogen which causes galls on willows (Salix species). Also known as a rust fungus, it was first described by Felix von Thümen in 1879.

== Description ==
Melampsora caprearum distorts the blades and veins of willow leaves, causing irregular spots with yellow-orange uredinia (which produce a powdery mass of spores). The rust has been found on eared willow (Salix aurita), goat willow (S. caprea), grey willow (S. cinerea) and their hybrids.

== Distribution ==
Has been recorded from Belgium (photo), Finland, Great Britain (common) and Poland.
