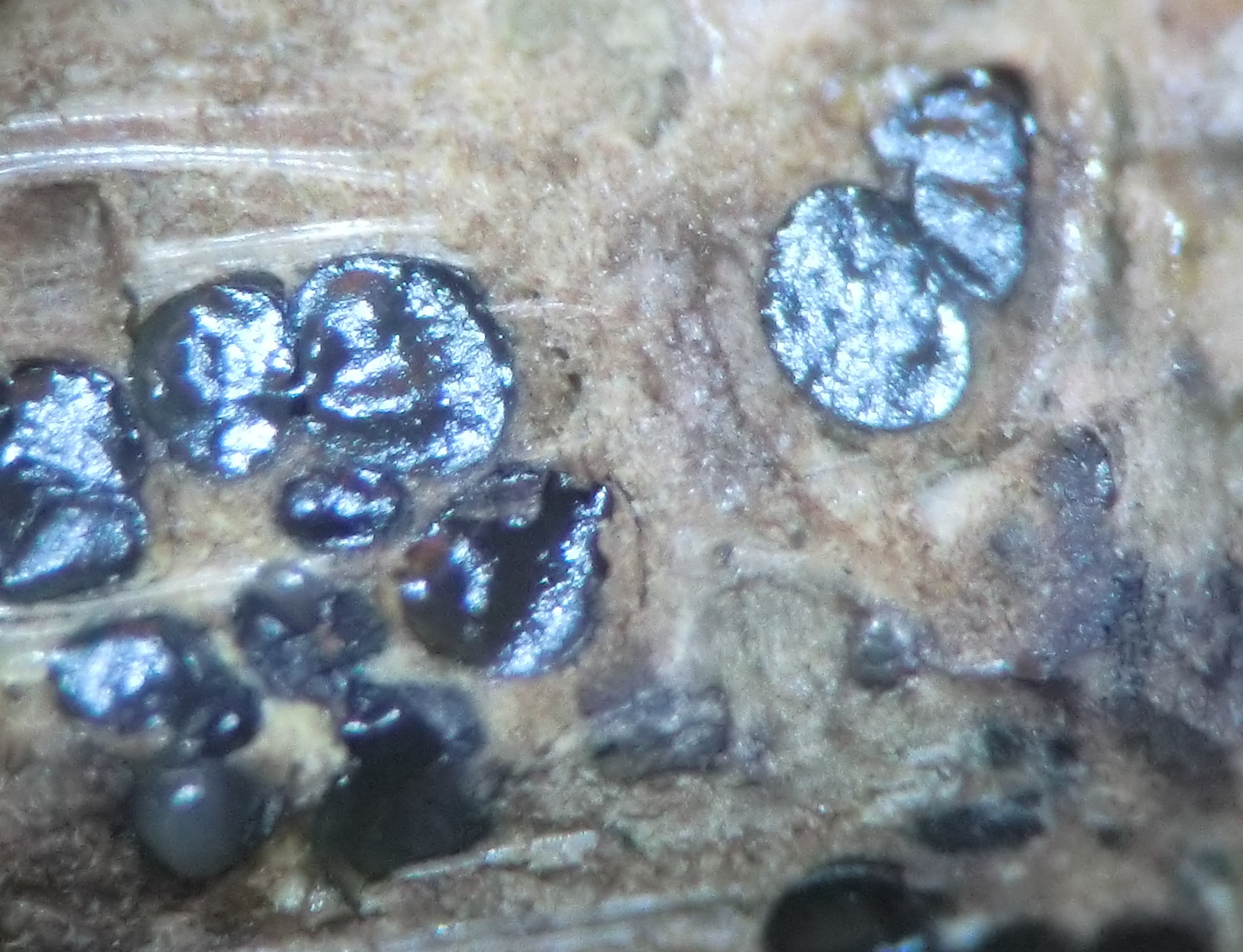
- Valsa salicina on Salix twigs

Scientific classification
- Kingdom: Fungi
- Division: Ascomycota
- Class: Sordariomycetes
- Order: Diaporthales
- Family: Valsaceae
- Genus: Valsa; Fr. (1849)

Type species
- Valsa ambiens (Pers.) Fr. (1849)

Synonyms
- Circinaria Bonord. (1851); Circinostoma Gray (1821); Engizostoma Gray (1821); Microstoma Auersw. (1860)

= Valsa =

Genus of fungi

Valsa is a genus of fungi within the family Valsaceae. There are about 70 species in the widespread genus. Anamorphs are classified in the genus Cytospora.

== Species ==
- Valsa abietis
- Valsa abrupta
- Valsa ambiens
- Valsa auerswaldii
- Valsa ceratophora
- Valsa ceratosperma
- Valsa ceuthospora
- Valsa cypri
- Valsa eugeniae
- Valsa germanica
- Valsa intermedia
- Valsa japonica
- Valsa kunzei
- Valsa laurocerasi
- Valsa mali
- Valsa nivea
- Valsa paulowniae
- Valsa pini
- Valsa platani
- Valsa pustulata
- Valsa querna
- Valsa salicina
- Valsa sordida
- Valsa syringae
