= Cytospora elegans =

Scientific classification
- Kingdom: Fungi
- Division: Ascomycota
- Class: Sordariomycetes
- Order: Diaporthales
- Family: Valsaceae
- Genus: Cytospora
- Species: C. elegans

Binomial name
- Cytospora elegans Ces., 1854

Species of fungus

Cytospora elegans is a species of ascomycete fungi in the family Valsaceae.
