= Cytospora personata =

Scientific classification
- Kingdom: Fungi
- Division: Ascomycota
- Class: Sordariomycetes
- Order: Diaporthales
- Family: Valsaceae
- Genus: Cytospora
- Species: C. personata

Binomial name
- Cytospora personata (Fr.) Sacc., (1884)

Synonyms
- Leucocytospora personata (Fr.) Höhn., (1917); Sphaeria personata Fr., (1818)

Species of fungus

Cytospora personata is a plant pathogen.
