= Valsa kunzei =

Scientific classification
- Kingdom: Fungi
- Division: Ascomycota
- Class: Sordariomycetes
- Order: Diaporthales
- Family: Valsaceae
- Genus: Valsa
- Species: V. kunzei

Binomial name
- Valsa kunzei Nitschke, (1846)

Synonyms
- Cytospora kunzei Sacc., (1884); Leucocytospora kunzei (Sacc.) Z. Urb. Valsa kunzei var. superficialis (Nitschke) Waterman, (1955)

Species of fungus

Valsa kunzei is a plant pathogen infecting Douglas-firs.

== See also ==
- List of Douglas-fir diseases
