= Cytospora sacchari =

Scientific classification
- Kingdom: Fungi
- Division: Ascomycota
- Class: Sordariomycetes
- Order: Diaporthales
- Family: Valsaceae
- Genus: Cytospora
- Species: C. sacchari

Binomial name
- Cytospora sacchari E.J. Butler, (1906)

Species of fungus

Cytospora sacchari is a plant pathogen.
