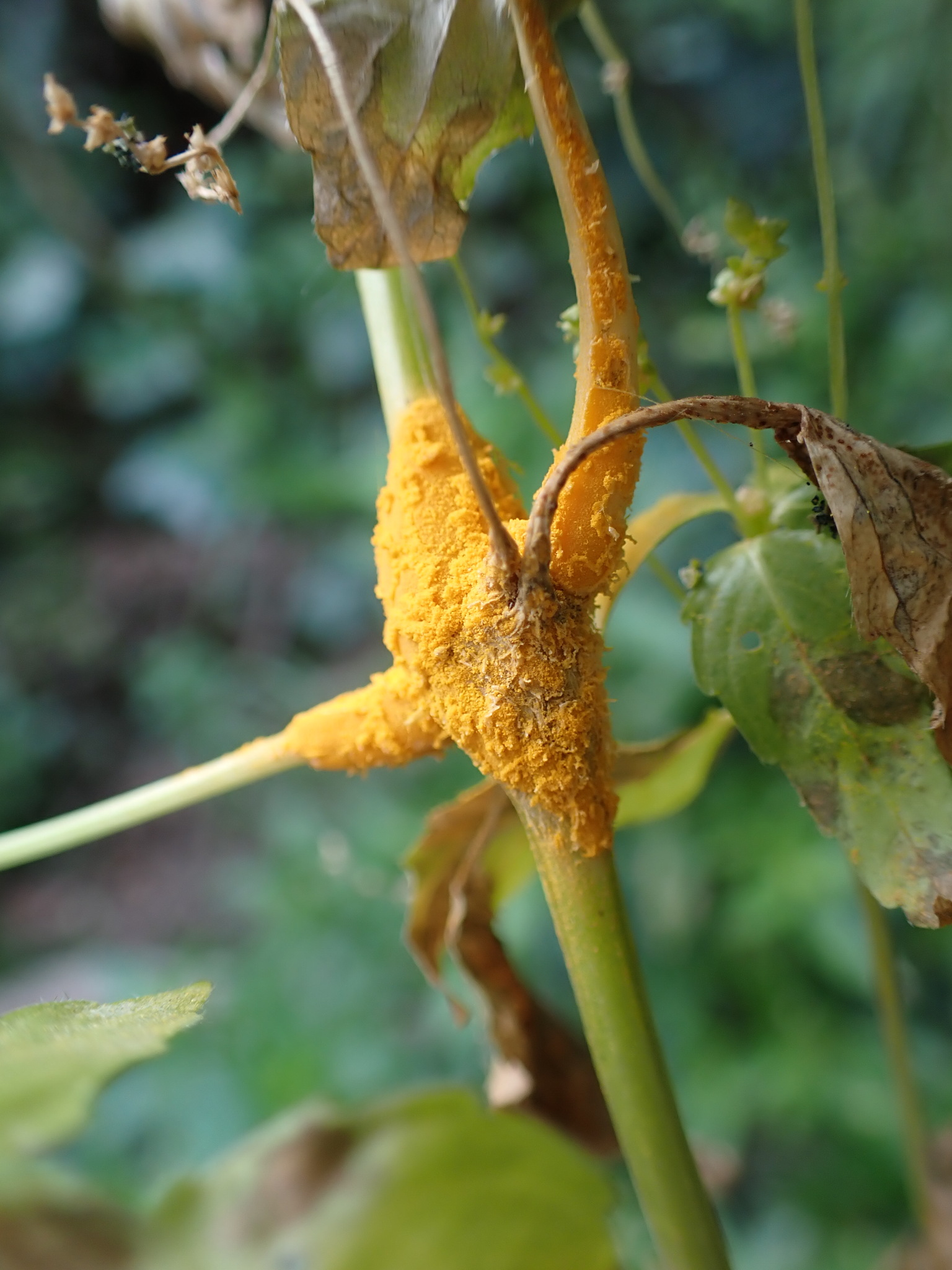

Scientific classification
- Domain: Eukaryota
- Kingdom: Fungi
- Division: Basidiomycota
- Class: Pucciniomycetes
- Order: Pucciniales
- Family: Melampsoraceae
- Genus: Melampsora
- Species: M. pulcherrima

Binomial name
- Melampsora pulcherrima Maire (1914)

= Melampsora pulcherrima =

Species of plant pathogen

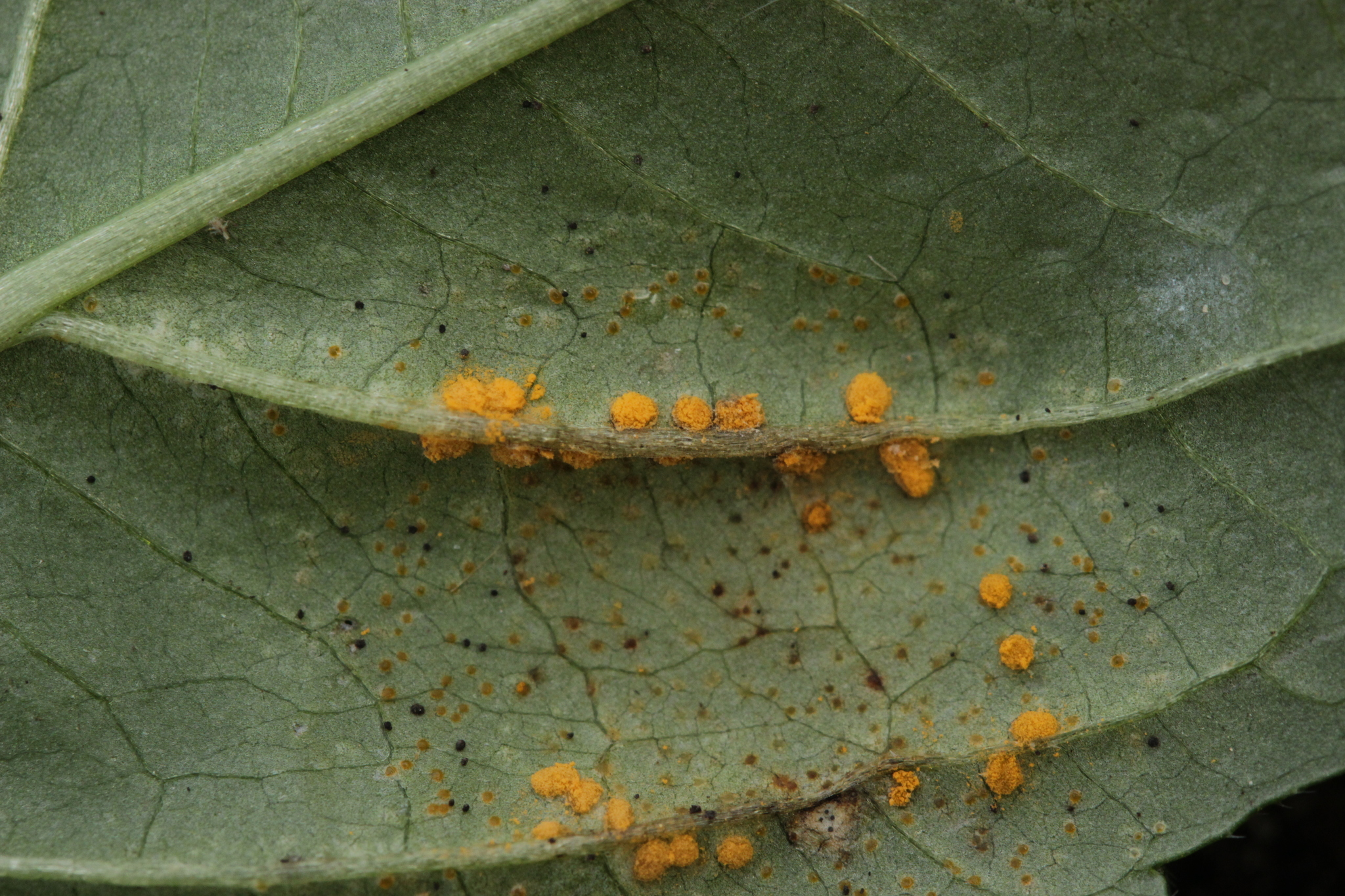

Melampsora pulcherrima is a Mediterranean plant pathogen. It is a rust that infects Mercurialis annua, causing galls, pycnia, and aecia over leaves and stem in winter, seen as a golden yellow swelling over several centimeters, as well as Populus alba, causing uredia and telia on leaves from spring until autumn.
