= Cytospora palmarum =

Scientific classification
- Kingdom: Fungi
- Division: Ascomycota
- Class: Sordariomycetes
- Order: Diaporthales
- Family: Valsaceae
- Genus: Cytospora
- Species: C. palmarum

Binomial name
- Cytospora palmarum Cooke

Pathogenic fungus

Cytospora palmarum is a plant pathogen that causes leaf blight on coconut.

== Distribution ==
Found in Fiji in 2018.
