= Cytospora sacculus =

Scientific classification
- Kingdom: Fungi
- Division: Ascomycota
- Class: Sordariomycetes
- Order: Diaporthales
- Family: Valsaceae
- Genus: Cytospora
- Species: C. sacculus

Binomial name
- Cytospora sacculus (Schwein.) Gvrit. (1969)

Species of fungus

Cytospora sacculus is a plant pathogen.
