= Leucostoma =

Leucostoma may refer to:

- Leucostoma (fly), a fly genus in the family Tachinidae
- Leucostoma (fungus), a genus of fungi within the family Valsaceae
