= Valsa auerswaldii =

Scientific classification
- Kingdom: Fungi
- Division: Ascomycota
- Class: Sordariomycetes
- Order: Diaporthales
- Family: Valsaceae
- Genus: Valsa
- Species: V. auerswaldii

Binomial name
- Valsa auerswaldii Nitschke, 1870

Species of fungus

Valsa auerswaldii is a plant pathogen infecting apples.

== See also ==
- List of apple diseases
