= Melampsora amygdalinae =

Scientific classification
- Domain: Eukaryota
- Kingdom: Fungi
- Division: Basidiomycota
- Class: Pucciniomycetes
- Order: Pucciniales
- Family: Melampsoraceae
- Genus: Melampsora
- Species: M. amygdalinae

Binomial name
- Melampsora amygdalinae Klebahn, 1909

Species of fungus

Melampsora amygdalinae is a fungal pathogen and part of the division Basidiomycota. It is known as a rust fungus that is host specific. M. amygdalinae commonly infects willows of the genus Salix. This fungus was first discovered in 1909 by Heinrich Klebahn who was a professor of soil biology in Hamburg. Neimi at el. explain how the pathogen occurs throughout the whole distribution of the host, and the small natural populations are an area of interest. This rust fungus is annual (non systemic) and autoecious, which references the fungus spending its entire life in a single host.

== Hosts and symptoms ==
Willows are a highly susceptible host that this pathogen targets. Fungicides are not usually used for its protection, as the result is not effective. The fungicides needed for this rust fungus would also affect the surrounding environment. “Several studies reported very low differentiation among samples of fungal pathogens of agricultural crops or forestry trees from different localities across a continent.” To further explain, this shows that this fungus affects its host similarly across the continent. The environment and location of the fungus does not differentiate its functionality. Symptoms that appear on willows are commonly seen as galls. M. amygdalinae distorts the blades and veins of willow, causing irregular spots, bearing the orange yellow uredinia, which is the lesion that forms on the leaf surface. Pustules are what the lesion is referred to as. “The host range and pathogenicity of these species have remained static as no breakdown in host resistance has been observed”. To expand, the host plant has yet to show signs of resistance, only emphasizing the evidence of its susceptibility. This pathogen lacks telia and tends to overwinter in its specific host. The pathogen and the host have the ability to reproduce sexually and are both locally adapted to each other.

== Disease cycle ==
The life cycle of M. amygdalinae is macrocyclic, or has all spore states in its life cycle, which is important to know when trying to perform any disease management. In the spring it undergoes sexual reproduction and the teliospores germinate after overwintering, then produce basidia. The basidia then release basidiospores that travel through the wind to infect the host plant. The host is infected by the haploid basidiospores that form spermagonia. “After dikaryotization by transfer of spermatia to the receiving structures of compatible mating types, aecia are formed. From these, aecidiospores are dispersed, which, after germination, form uredia on infected host tissue”. The pustule structure formed on the leaf, asexually produce uredospores, which travel by wind dispersal. “The spread of rust on a willow host takes place during the summer and includes several repeated cycles of clonal propagation of urediniospores. The urediniospores are capable to produce the next generation in 6-7 days”. The life cycle is fast and regenerates quickly, taking over the hosts at a more rapid rate. This is an obligate pathogen, and heavily relies on its host for survival.

== Management ==
With this fungal pathogen being highly host specific, it stays in the environment of its host the willow. Willows are not as shade tolerant as most other plants, so they need an open canopy of tree branches to let a good amount of sunlight in. They also thrive in moist, nutrient rich soils, that are in colder environments. One area of abundance can be found in Europe, in areas of wetter soils. Keeping this pathogen at bay can be a challenge. “Rusts caused by Melampsora spp. are the most severe threat today. Rust attacks influence the development of winter dormancy in the host and indirectly frost hardiness”. The severity of this fungal pathogen makes it hard to control. It can cause additional infections that require separate management. It takes a lot of time and effort to control fungal pathogens, so new methods may have to be performed in the case of new infections developing. Melampsora amygdalinae is only one of many species under the genus Melampsora. Identifying this pathogen directly requires a deeper examination of the proper prevention tasks. Little evidence has been recorded on preventative actions, due to its difficulty to control. Rust fungi such as this are usually damaged by outside factors such as beetles. So, the damage done to the Salix host may be further progressed even with other feeding damage. “The productivity of Salix biomass can be reduced by more than 30-50% dry matter by rust”.
