= P. indica =

P. indica may refer to:

- Paravalsa indica, a fungus species
- Persea indica, a plant species
- Pleodorina indica, a colonial green alga species in the genus Pleodorina
- Plumbago indica, the scarlet leadwort, a pot plant species originally from India
- Potentilla indica, the mock strawberry or Indian strawberry, a plant species
- Pseudomonas indica, a Gram-negative, butane-using bacterium species first isolated in India
- Pulvinaria indica, a scale insect species in the genus Pulvinaria
- Piriformospora indica, an endophytic root colonizing fungus, first isolated from the Thar Desert in India

== Synonyms ==
- Periploca indica, a synonym for Hemidesmus indicus, a plant species found in South Asia

== See also ==
- Indica (disambiguation)
