= Melampsora hirculi =

Scientific classification
- Domain: Eukaryota
- Kingdom: Fungi
- Division: Basidiomycota
- Class: Pucciniomycetes
- Order: Pucciniales
- Family: Melampsoraceae
- Genus: Melampsora
- Species: M. hirculi

Binomial name
- Melampsora hirculi Lindr., (1902)

Species of fungus

Melampsora hirculi is a pathogenic fungus in the order of Pucciniales or rust fungi. It is causes disease in Saxifraga hirculus.
