= Leucostoma auerswaldii =

Scientific classification
- Kingdom: Fungi
- Division: Ascomycota
- Class: Sordariomycetes
- Order: Diaporthales
- Family: Valsaceae
- Genus: Leucostoma
- Species: L. auerswaldii

Binomial name
- Leucostoma auerswaldii (Nitschke) Höhn. (1928)

Species of fungus

Leucostoma auerswaldii is a plant pathogen.
