= Cytospora terebinthi =

Scientific classification
- Kingdom: Fungi
- Division: Ascomycota
- Class: Sordariomycetes
- Order: Diaporthales
- Family: Valsaceae
- Genus: Cytospora
- Species: C. terebinthi

Binomial name
- Cytospora terebinthi Bres.

Species of fungus

Cytospora terebinthi is a plant pathogen.
