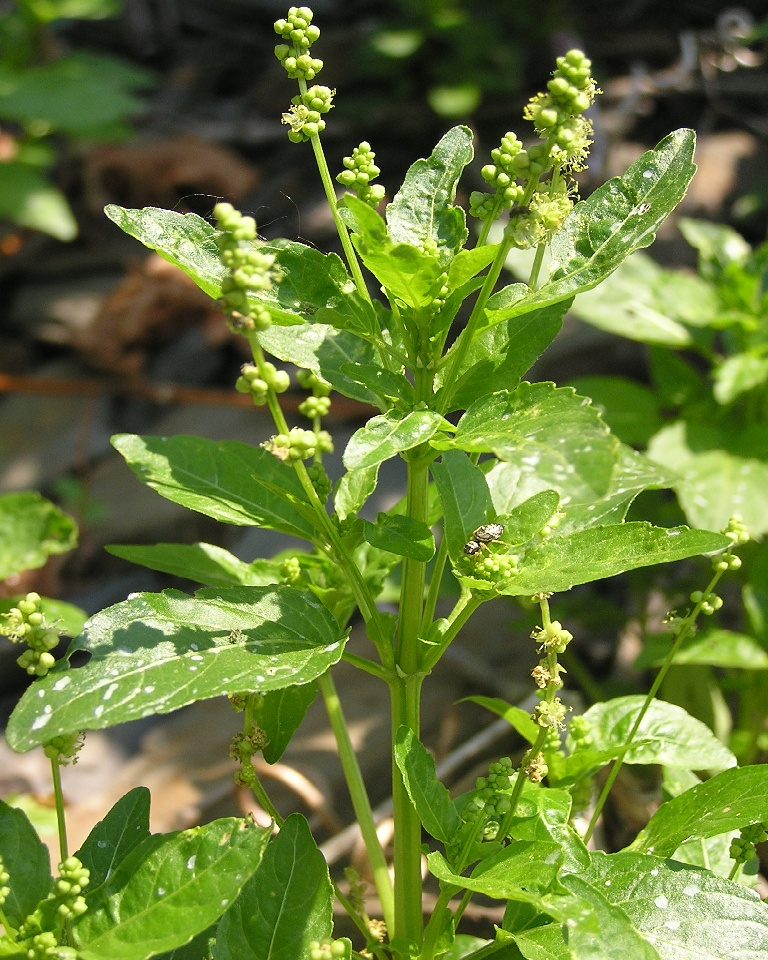

Conservation status
- Least Concern (IUCN 3.1)

Scientific classification
- Kingdom: Plantae
- Clade: Embryophytes
- Clade: Tracheophytes
- Clade: Angiosperms
- Clade: Eudicots
- Clade: Rosids
- Order: Malpighiales
- Family: Euphorbiaceae
- Genus: Mercurialis
- Species: M. annua

Binomial name
- Mercurialis annua L.

= Mercurialis annua =

Annual mercury

Species of flowering plant in the spurge family

Mercurialis annua, annual mercury, is a species of flowering plant in the spurge family Euphorbiaceae. It is native to the Middle East and the Mediterranean region, where it grows on bare, sandy soils. Its seeds are dispersed by harvester ants, which remove an oily coating that delays germination. In recent centuries, annual mercury has spread to northern Europe and many other parts of the world as an agricultural and urban weed. It has been studied for its complex genetics and breeding system. The name is from the Roman god Mercury, due to its association with fertility.

== Description ==
Annual mercury is an annual herb which typically grows to about 30–50 cm (exceptionally, up to 1 m) tall, with an erect, branched stem that has two strong ridges along its length, changing sides at each node. The whole plant is more-or-less glabrous and, when broken, it exudes a watery sap (not a white latex, as other Euphorbiaceae do). It is easily uprooted to reveal a bundle of thin, fibrous roots.

The leaves are arranged in opposite pairs and have a short petiole about 1 cm long (exceptionally up to 4 cm), with tiny green stipules, 1–2 mm long, at the base. Each leaf is about 7 cm long by 3.5 cm wide, ovate with a pointed tip, and up to about 10 (range: 4–18) blunt teeth along each side, each with a hydathode at the tip.

Plants can be male, female or hermaphrodite, giving rise to dioecious, monoecious, gynodioecious or androdioecious populations, which is very unusual in the plant kingdom. Male plants have their flowers arranged at the tips of long stalks (peduncles) arising from the leaf axils and projecting beyond the leaves. Female plants have their flowers in sessile clusters of 1–4 at the nodes of the branches, or on short (4 mm) pedicels. Hermaphrodite flowers, where these occur, have a similar arrangement to the female flowers. Sometimes these are functionally female, producing no pollen or even lacking stamens entirely.

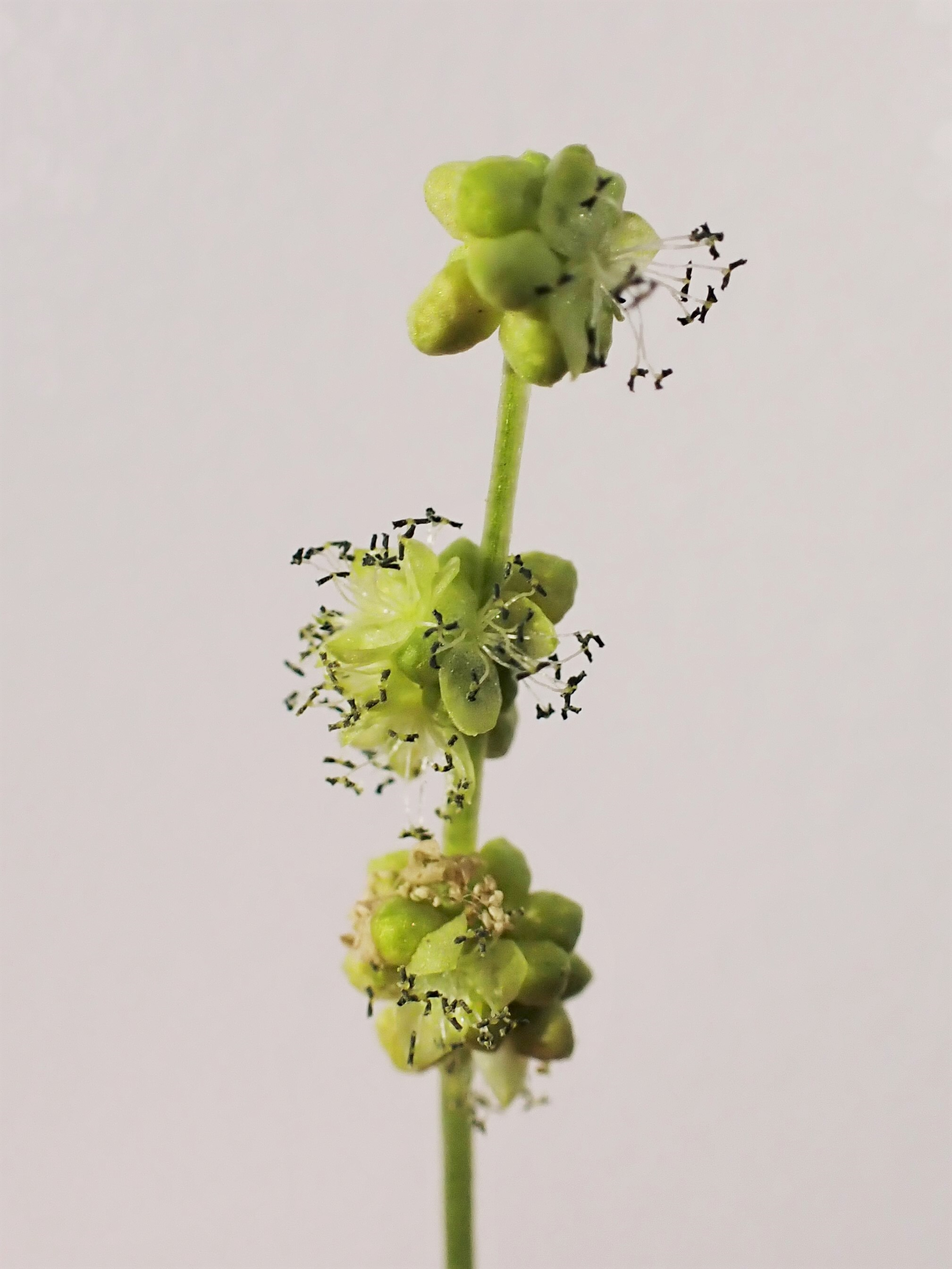
Closeup of the male flowers after anthesis

Even in the north of its range, annual mercury can usually be found flowering all year round. The flowers of both sexes have 3 perianth segments which look like small yellowish-green petals about 2 mm long. The males have 8–12 stamens which are somewhat longer than the tepals, with yellow anthers that turn black after the pollen is released. Female flowers have two ovaries and two styles, with bristle-tipped tubercles.

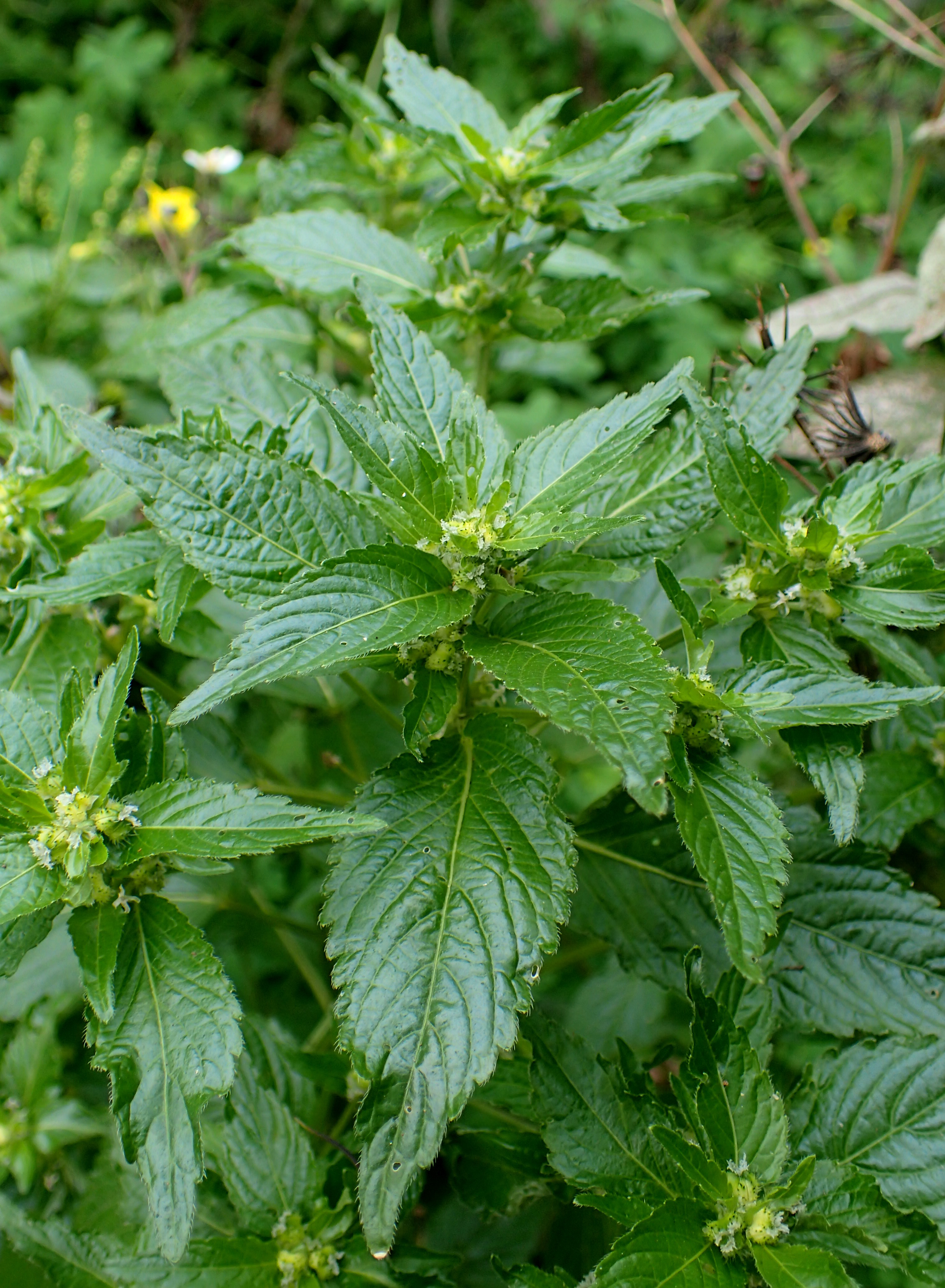
Female plants typically do not have their flowers on long peduncles, but sessile on the branches and the tip of the stem.

The fruit is a capsule, or schizocarp up to about 4 mm long with a warty, spiky coat, which splits into two mericarps as it matures. Each mericarp contains one shiny brown seed which is about 2 mm in diameter and has a caruncle at one end. These are explosively expelled from the mericarp as it dries and turns inside-out, being fired about 30 cm (small seeds might go as far as 130 cm) from the parent plant.

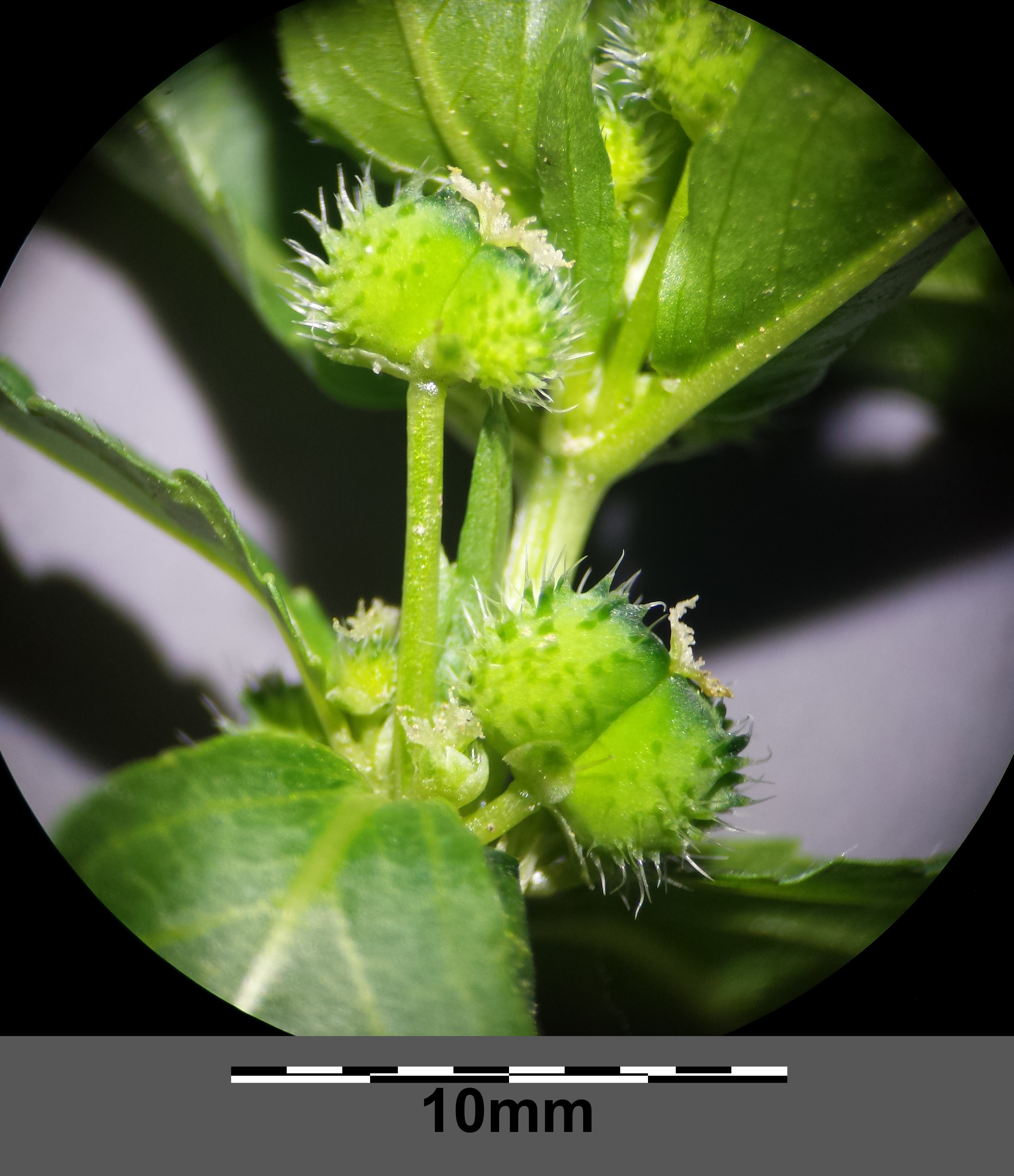
The fruits are covered with hair-tipped tubercles and consist of two mericarps, each with one seed.

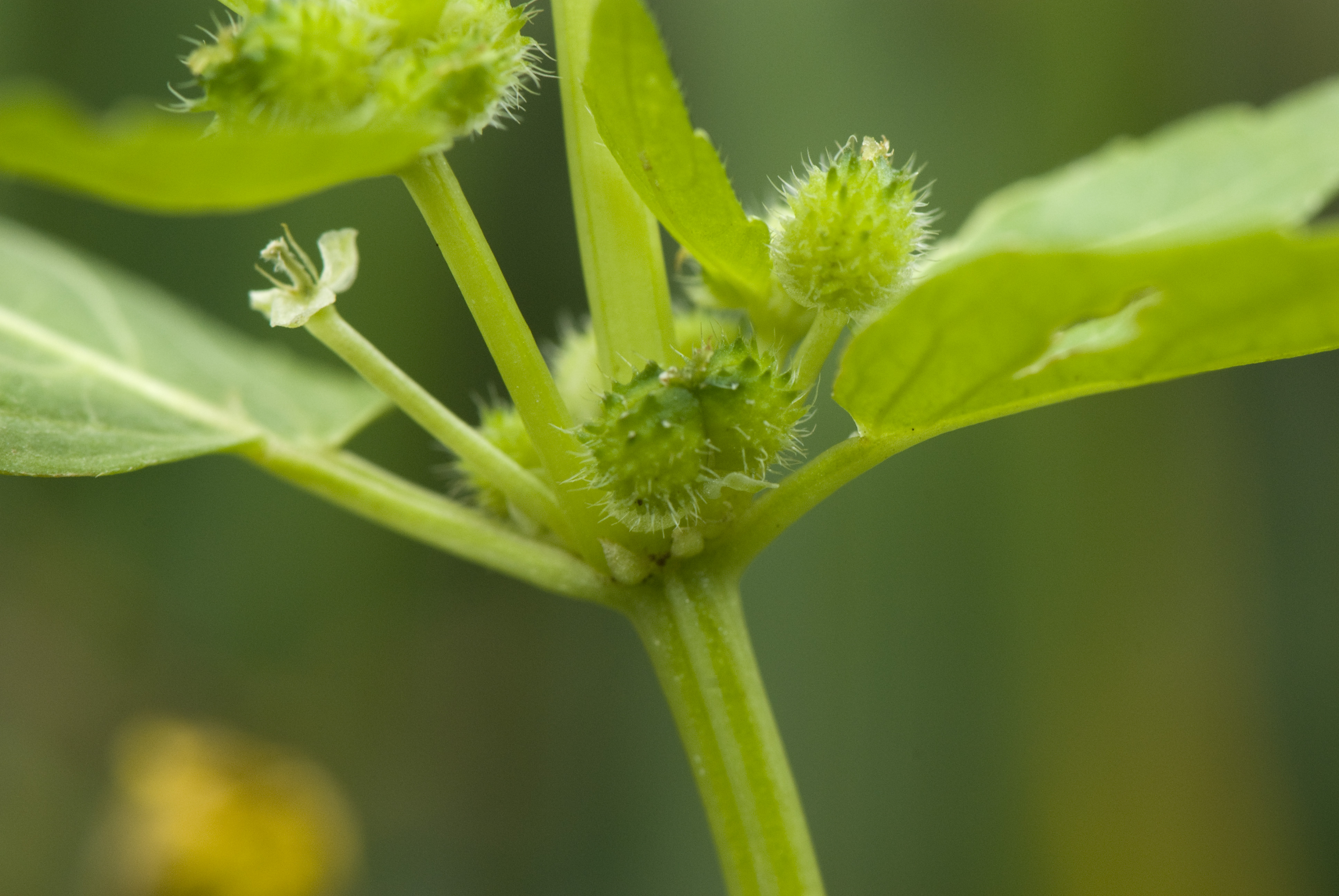
Female flowers on the main stem have a short pedicel (<1 cm) and 3 whitish tepals.

== Identification ==
In Europe, the plant most resembling annual mercury is dog's mercury. They do not grow in the same habitat: annual mercury is a weed of waste ground, whereas dog's mercury is a woodland plant, but they can sometimes be found in proximity, for example along woodland paths. The main differences between them are that annual mercury is easily uprooted, has branched stems, and is almost hairless except on the leaf margins; whereas dog's mercury is rhizomatous, unbranched, and usually hairy all over.

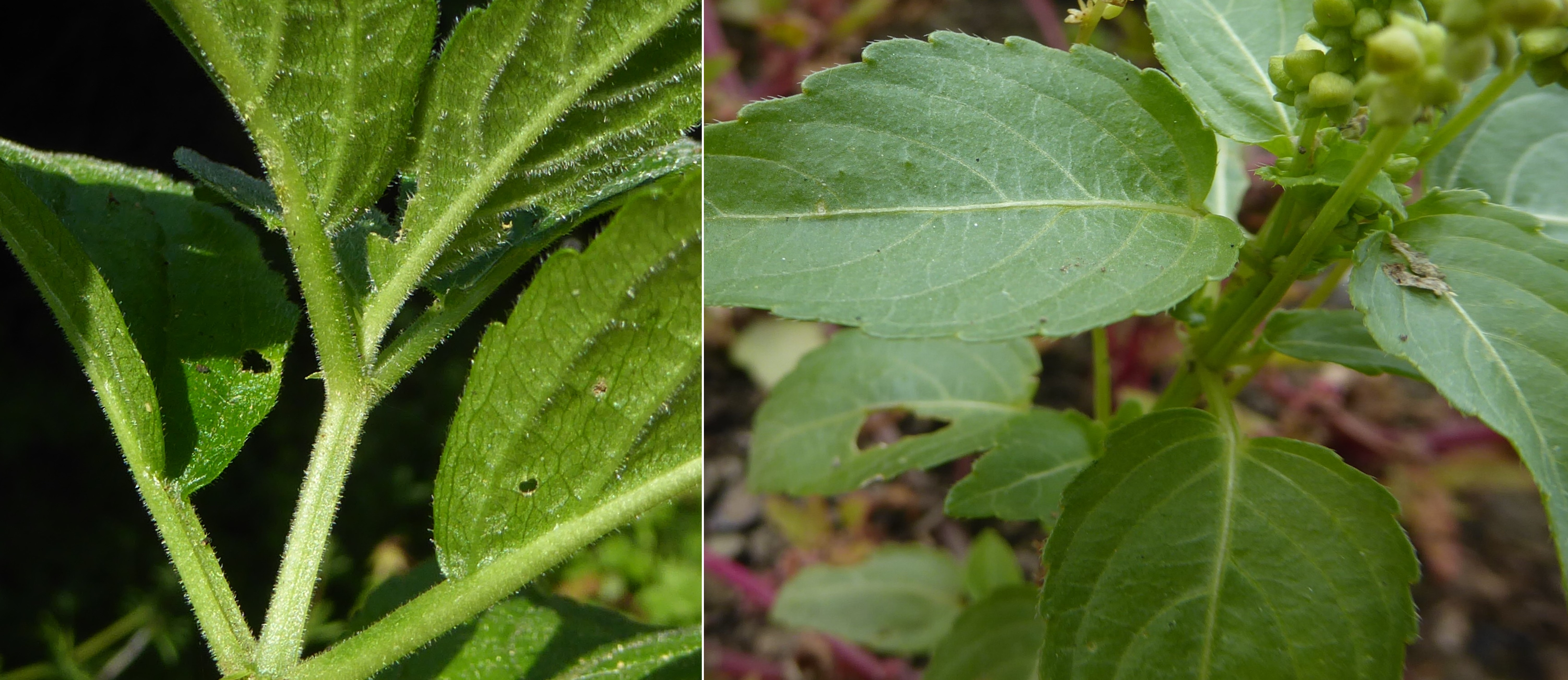
Dog's mercury (left) vs. annual mercury (right)

Acalypha australis may look similar but has large shield-like bracts under the female flowers (Flora of China).

== Taxonomy and genetics ==
Mercurialis annua was named by Linnaeus in Species Plantarum (p. 1035) in 1753. He classified it among the "enneandria" (the 9-stamened plants) and gave as synonyms Mercurialis caule brachiato, foliis glabris (the mercury with a branched stem and hairless leaves) in Hortus Cliffortianus and Mercurialis testiculata (the mercury with testicles) in Bauhin's Pinax Theatri Botanici. Linnaeus also assigned it the astronomical symbol for the sun (☉), which was simply a code that meant "annual".

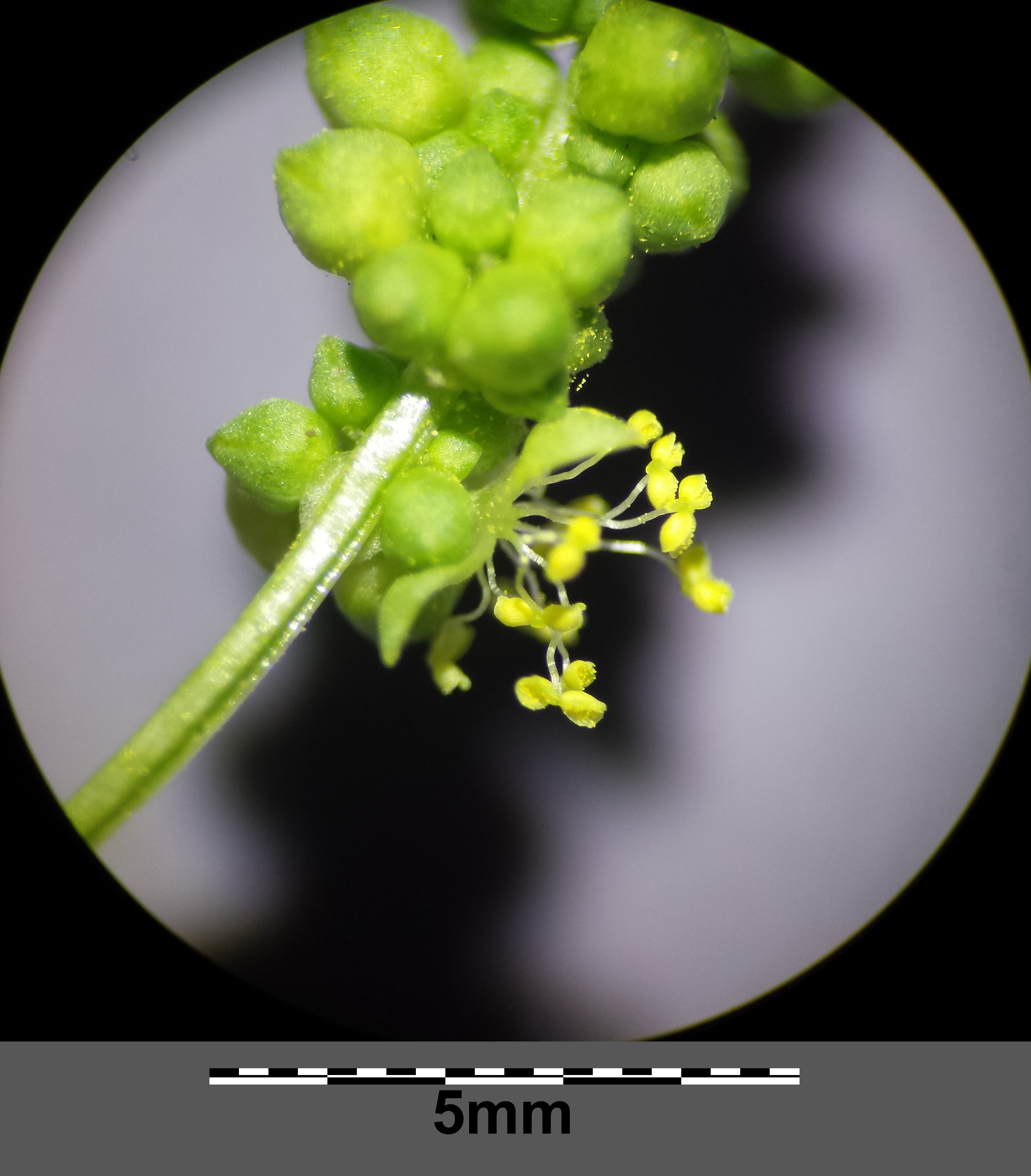
Fertile male flowers produce large quantities of yellow pollen.

The original name is still used today, but several synonyms have been coined over the years, including Mercurialis ambigua L.f. (1762), Discoplis serrata Raf. (1838), and Mercurialis monoica (Moris) B.M. Durand (1963). None of these is currently accepted.

A large number of subspecies, forms and varieties have also been named over the years, but again they have not been widely adopted. Some of the variety within this species can be explained by the breeding system and the polyploidy. There are no known hybrids with other species.

In most of Europe, M. annua is a diploid with a chromosome number 2n = 16. In these areas, populations are always dioecious (although it is never hard to find individual plants which do not conform). In parts of southern Europe and north Africa, however, plants are sometimes tetraploid, hexaploid, or have even higher levels of ploidy, and it is also in these areas that monoecy, androdioecy and gynodioecy occur. Studies so far have failed to establish whether the sexual system determines the ploidy level, or vice versa, or even if they are necessarily linked.

Various authors have offered explanations for the name of the genus. Leighton states that is named in honour of Mercury, because he first discovered its virtues. If this is a reference to the magical herb moly, which Mercury (as Hermes) gave to Odysseus, it is unlikely to be the correct plant, because it doesn't have a black stem and white flower. Richard Mabey claims that the "true" mercuries are goosefoots, specifically Chenopodium bonus-henricus, and that the name became attached to this genus because of a superficial resemblance between them. However, Dioscorides was using this name in Roman times, drawing a comparison between the fruits of the plant and certain attributes of the deity.

The common English name simply separates it from perennial, or dog's mercury, Mercurialis perennis. Culpeper referred to it as French mercury. Dioscorides and Pliny used the Ancient Greek name linozostis and said it was called by the Romans herba Mercurialis mascula or M. testiculata; and by the Egyptians aphlopho.

== Distribution and status ==
Annual mercury is native to the Middle East and countries bordering the Mediterranean Sea, where it occurs in desert and semi-arid regions, and from which it has spread to disturbed, agricultural soils and urban areas around the world. In the Arabian Peninsula it is found on sandy soils in mountain valleys, at an altitude of 1,200 m, where it grows just 5 cm tall.

It is present in all the mainland départements of France, where it is considered native, as well as Guadeloupe and Martinique, where it is introduced. In all these areas it is considered to be common, and the conservation status is LC (Least Concern).

In Britain, annual mercury occurs mainly in the south and east but it has spread north in the latter half of the 20th century, becoming roughly three times as widespread. Towards the northern parts of its range it becomes an increasingly urban weed, possibly benefiting from the urban heat island effect, where it grows on pavements and rubble. The first British record was in 1538 by William Turner and, to judge from other early records, it was not common at that time. Its conservation status is LC (Least Concern).

== Habitat and ecology ==
Annual mercury is native to arid regions around the Mediterranean, where it can find bare, dry soil in which to grow. When the fruit is formed, it is dispersed by a three-stage process. Firstly the seeds are catapulted away by the exploding seedpods, typically travelling around 30 cm from the parent plant. When these seeds land, the vibration caused by the impact attracts harvester ants of the genus Messor (in Italy, the species M. structor (Latreille, 1798)) which immediately gather them up and transport them to their nests, up to 5 m away. There, the ants remove the caruncle and deposit the seeds in chambers within the nest. With the caruncle removed, the seeds are ready to germinate, but they will not do so until the third stage occurs, when the ant nest is destroyed by some external event such as animal disturbance, flood, or ploughing. The soil from the ant nest is particularly rich and friable, making a perfect seedbed for new plants. For this reason, annual mercury is especially common in agricultural land, where it behaves not as a ruderal colonist of bare ground, but as a specialised inhabitant of places with regular disturbance events.

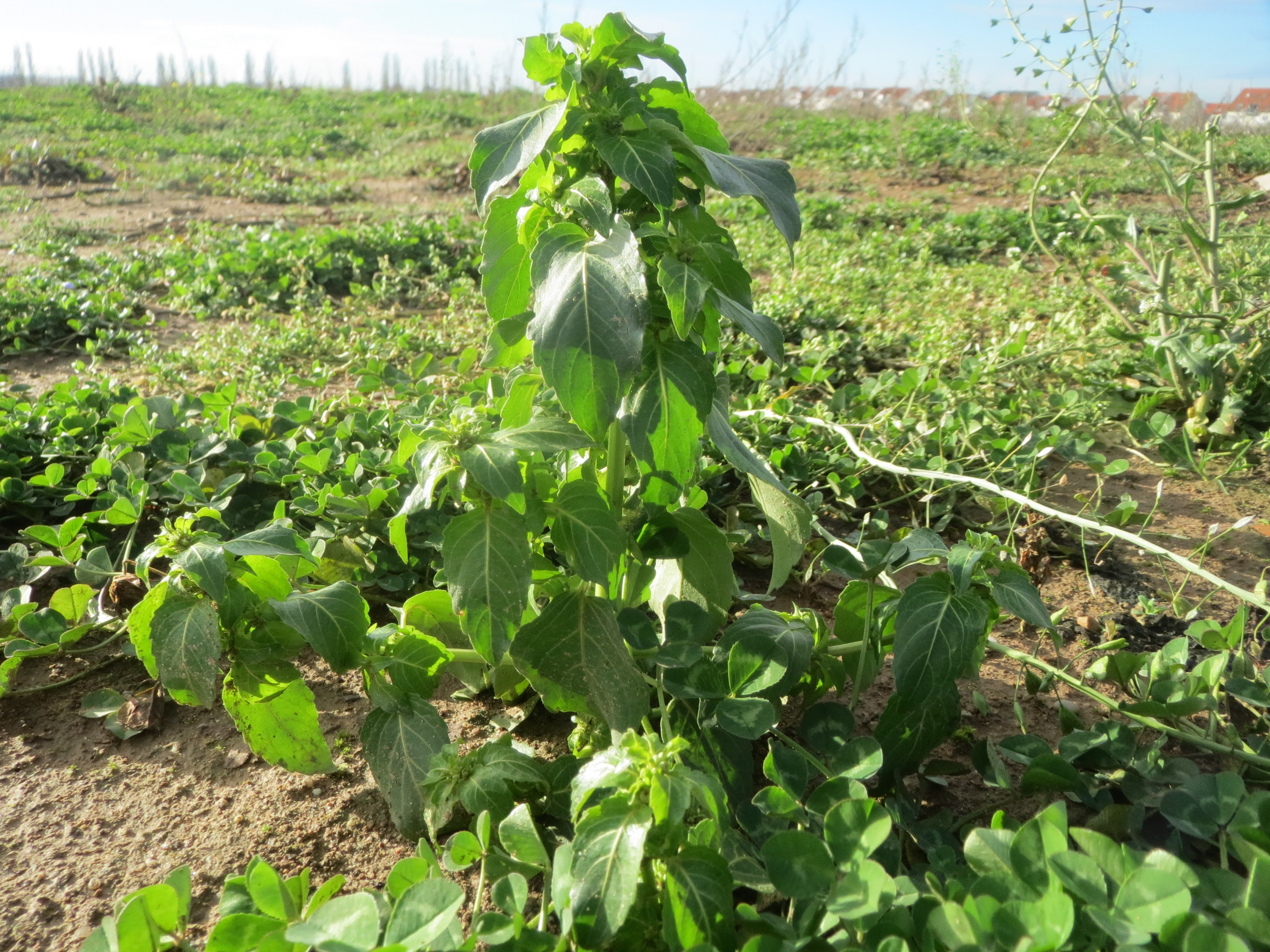
Typical habitat in Northern Europe is in field margins and cultivated land.

In the north of its range, where harvester ants do not occur (and during the winter in the south), a different dispersal strategy occurs. The seeds of annual mercury have an extremely low germination rate while the caruncle is present, but continued exposure to water for 48 hours allows a proportion of the seeds to develop, over a long period of time (2 weeks or more, rather than just a day or two for the seeds from an ant nest). This allows the plant to act as a pioneer species, moving into new areas of bare ground when carried by floodwater.

The habitats it grows in include Eastern Mediterranean limestone screes (Eunis code H2.68), on old walls (J1.31), and on disturbed soils in little robin/hairy bittercress, nettle-leaved goosefoot, and hedge mustard vegetation communities.

Annual mercury has spread across Britain from the south in recent centuries, initially as an inhabitant of warm micro-climates in urban areas. Here it often grows at the base of walls where there also a rich supply of nutrients, along with such plants as black horehound, common mallow and hedge mustard. Subsequently, it spreads to arable fields and waste ground, and it is described in the National Vegetation Classification as occurring in OV6 sticky mouse-ear, OV9 scentless mayweed and OV13 chickweed communities. Its Ellenberg values in Britain are L=7, F=5, R=7, N=7 and S=0, which means that it grows in places that are well-lit, damp, neutral and richly fertile.

Although it is generally thought to be wind-pollinated, male annual mercury plants can produce tens of thousands of flowers in a growing season, and these give rise to vast quantities of pollen and nectar, so a single plant might be visited by hundreds of insects daily.

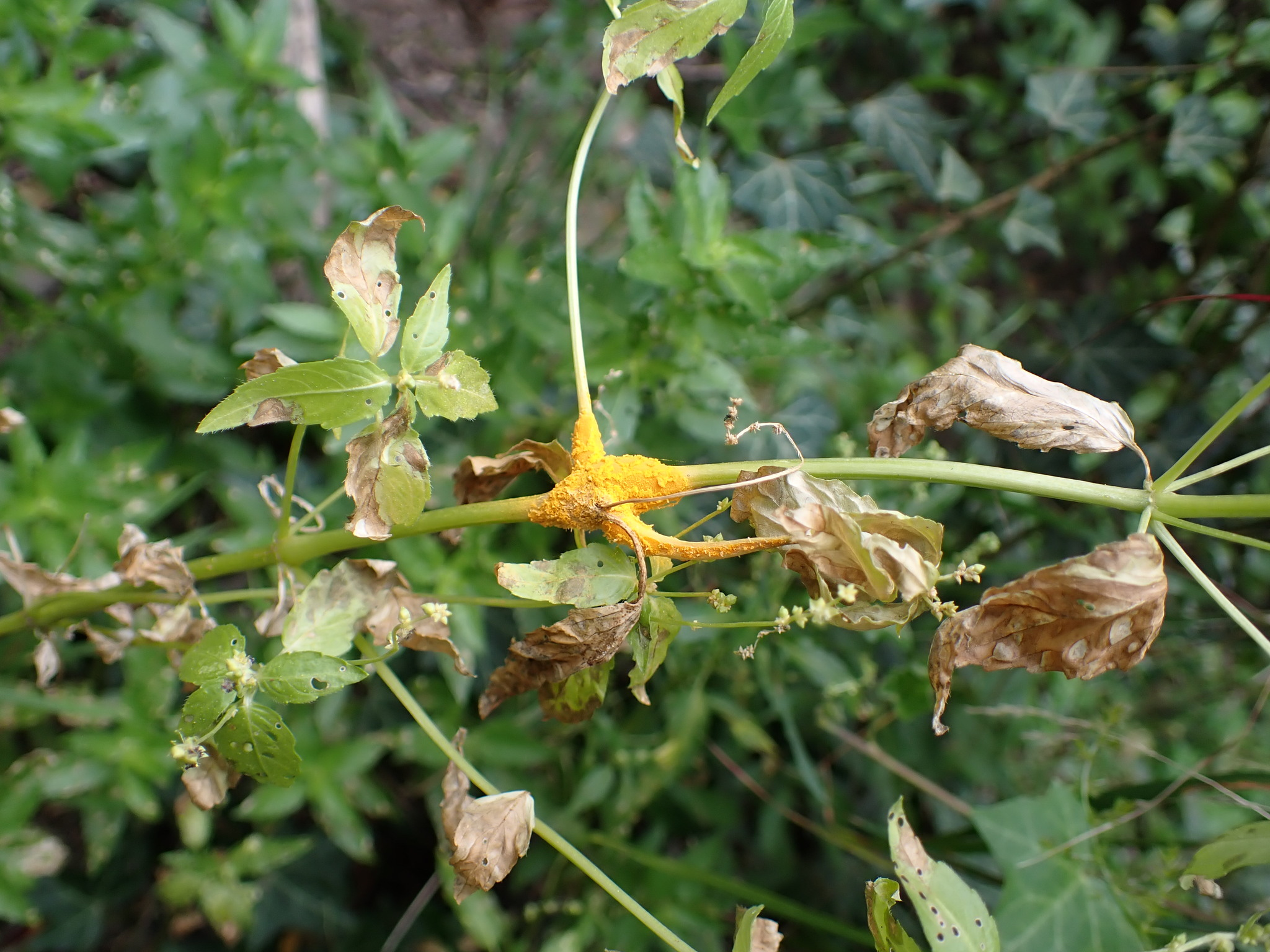
An annual mercury plant blighted by the fungus Melampsora pulcherrima

If pests or diseases are specific to a particular plant, this can be strongly indicative of the place where that plant evolved. The fungus Aecidium marcii Bubák, 1903 is found only on annual mercury and not in any European country except Turkey. This suggests a Middle Eastern origin rather than a pan-Mediterranean one. The gall-forming fungus Leveillula chrozophorae Braun, 1984 is also restricted to the Middle East, but it is polyphagous on various species of the spurge family. However, Aleyrodes elevatus Silvestri, 1934 is a whitefly which spends part of its lifecycle on mercury or pellitory and occurs throughout the Mediterranean.

Throughout Europe, annual mercury is commonly infested with several non-specialist fungi such as the rusts Melampsora pulcherrima and Melampsora populnea agg., specifically the cryptic species M. rostrupii G.H. Wagner, which is known as the dog's-mercury rust in Britain. The former infests the stems with an orange coating, while the latter produces small black dots on the surface of the leaves. Another rust-like infection is caused by Synchytrium mercurialis (Libert) Fuckel, 1870, which produces glassy, golden warts and can distort the leaves. Other fungi that occur on this plant include Cercospora mercurialis Passerini, 1877, which causes mottling of the leaves, and the rusts Puccinia cynodontis Lacroix, 1859 and P. isiacae (von Thümen) Winter, 1887.

Amongst the polyphagous insects that utilise annual mercury, amongst other plants, are the winter webworm and the spurge hawk-moth, whose larvae eat the leaves, and the weevils Tropiphorus elevatus and Kalcapion semivittatum (Gyllenhal, 1833), whose larvae create a large, oval swelling inside the stem or the petiole. Laparocerus junonius Machado, 2007, L. rasus Wollaston, 1864 and L. roudieri Machado, 2007 have free-living larvae which feed on the roots of this and other species. Two aphids, the foxglove and buckthorn, feed on the foliage, whilst the fly Liriomyza bryoniae is a leaf miner. The only beetle associated with it is Hermaeophaga cicatrix (Illiger, 1807).

== In culture ==
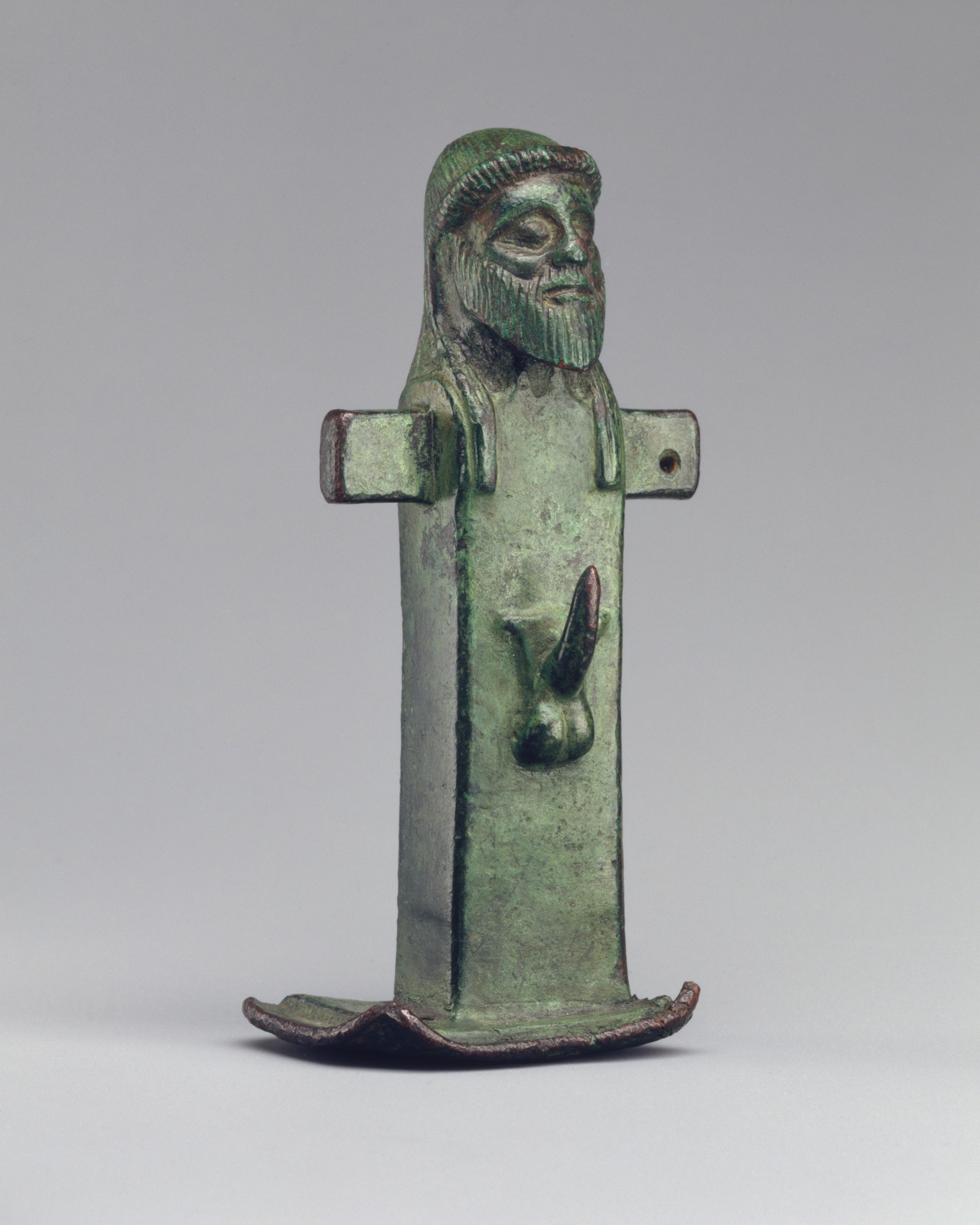
A bronze herm

A herm (in Rome they were known as "mercuriae") is a statue consisting of a square block of stone with the head of Hermes (Mercury) and a prominent set of male genitalia. As the fruits of annual mercury resemble testicles, the association with mercuriae is apparent.

Ancient herbalists had many uses for annual mercury. Dioscorides observed the symbolism of the fruits, writing "the male has branches that are small and round, as though it were two little stones lying together." Following the doctrine of signatures, he claimed that a paste made from the "male" plant would cause the conception of a male child, while "female" plants would have the opposite effect. Modern botanists would consider the plant that bears the fruit to be female but, as the odds of it working would have been about 50-50, this might not have mattered.

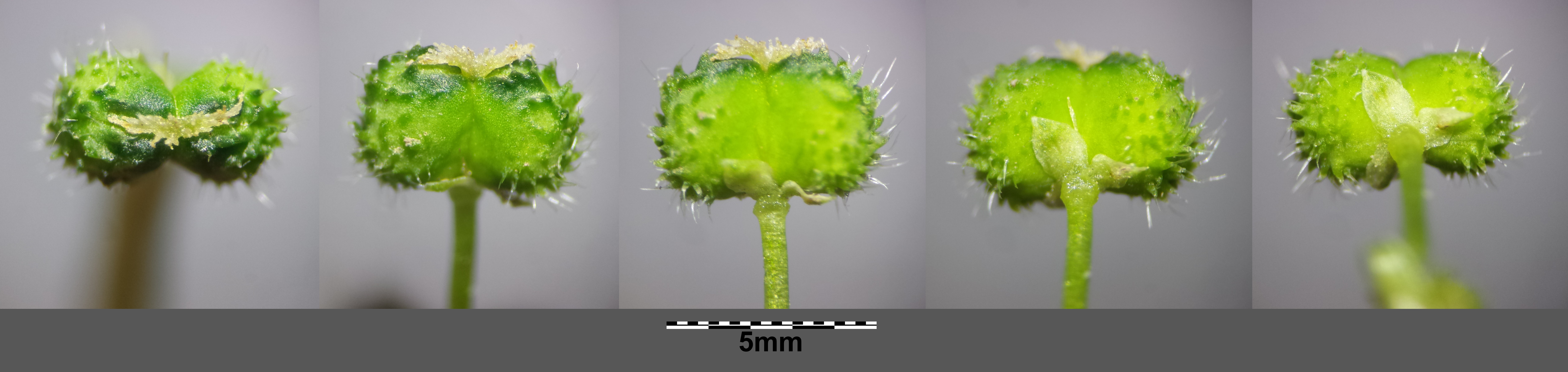
The characteristic shape of the fruits give rise to its name.

Culpeper was similarly confused about the biology of mercury plants, in the 17th century: "at every joint in the male Mercury two small, round green heads, standing together upon a short foot stalk, which growing ripe, are seeds, not having flowers." He considered it useful mainly for gynecological problems, and questioned its association with the god, writing "Mercury, they say, owns the herb, but I rather think it is Venus's, and I am partly confident of it too, for I never heard that Mercury ever minded women's business so much."

By the 20th century, the biology was understood, but confusion between annual and dog's mercury had brought the herb into disrepute. Dog's mercury is much more common than annual in Northern Europe, and Maud Grieve seems to have reassigned the medicinal properties to the former, saying that annual mercury "is now disregarded in England."

== Uses ==
It is not known whether annual mercury is poisonous to humans or not. The closely related dog's mercury certainly is, as there are cases where people have mistaken it for an edible herb such as spinach, and subsequently died. Similarly, livestock have been known to die after eating a type of mercury, but the species is not recorded.

Although this is not a native plant in America, it is reported that some First Nations people of eastern Canada have used the juices of the plant as a balm for wounds.
