= Leucostoma kunzei =

Scientific classification
- Kingdom: Fungi
- Division: Ascomycota
- Class: Sordariomycetes
- Order: Diaporthales
- Family: Valsaceae
- Genus: Leucostoma
- Species: L. kunzei

Binomial name
- Leucostoma kunzei (Fr.) Munk ex H. Kern, (1955)

Synonyms
- Leucostoma kunzei (Fr.) Munk, (1953); Sphaeria kunzei Fr., (1823); Valsa kunzei (Fr.) Fr., (1846)

Species of fungus

The plant pathogenic fungus Leucostoma kunzei (formerly Valsa kunzei) is the causal agent of Leucostoma canker (also known as Cytospora canker or spruce canker), a disease of spruce trees found in the Northern Hemisphere, predominantly on Norway spruce (Picea abies) and Colorado blue spruce (Picea pungens). This disease is one of the most common and detrimental stem diseases of Picea species in the northeastern United States, yet it also affects other coniferous species. Rarely does it kill its host tree; however, the disease does disfigure by killing host branches and causing resin exudation from perennial lesions on branches or trunks.

== Origins ==
Leucostoma kunzei or “Valsa kunzei” (Fr.:Fr) Fr. (conidial state -Cytospora kunzei) was first described by Waterman in 1955, as the causal agent for the branch and stem cankers she observed on Douglas fir. Waterman cultured the fungus from cankered trees from Washington, Pennsylvania, Vermont, New Hampshire, and Massachusetts and provided the first descriptions of the canker and fungus. She also noted cankered trees usually occurred on unfavorable sites or had been weakened by other environmental factors.

== Susceptible hosts ==
- Balsam Fir Abies balsamea
- Fraser Fir Abies fraseri
- European Larch Larix decidua
- Japanese Larch Larix kaempferi
- American Larch Larix laricina
- Norway Spruce Picea abies
- Engelmann Spruce Picea engelmannii
- White Spruce Picea glauca
- Black Spruce Picea mariana
- Caucasian Spruce Picea orientalis
- Colorado blue spruce Picea pungens
- Red Spruce Picea rubens
- Jack Pine Pinus banksiana
- Red Pine Pinus resinosa
- Eastern white pine Pinus strobus
- Bhutan Pine Pinus wallichiana
- Eldar Pine Pinus eldarica
- Douglas-fir Pseudotsuga menziesii
- Western Redcedar Thuja plicata
- Eastern Hemlock Tsuga canadensis

== Symptoms ==
Symptoms of this disease in spruce hosts include dead and dying branches and perennial lesions on the branches and trunk, which exude resins. Older branches (lower on the trees) sustain more damage than younger ones. In spring and early summer the foliage of an infected branches on host trees fade and turns brown, which is an indication of girdling occurring within a branch or along the mainstem caused by this pathogen. These brown needles will remain attached during the growing season and then fall off during the winter, leaving behind bare twigs and branches. This entire process can occur annually, moving from low branches to higher branches, thus destroying the symmetry of the host tree. Twigs and branches killed by this disease may remain on the diseased host tree for several years. All of this damage caused by this fungal pathogen does not typically begin until the host trees are at least 10–15 years old. However, in landscape nurseries small branches of young blue spruce or occasionally white spruce may be killed.

Lesions typically begin at the bases of small twigs and develop into elliptic or occasionally diamond-shaped cankers. Lesions that originate on branches close to the main stem may actually spread into the main stem. Cambium that has been killed by this disease has a brown to reddish brown internal coloration and is saturated with resins. The underlying sapwood, which has been killed and colonized by the pathogen, is rarely discolored. Amber colored resin profusely exudes from the edges of cankers, runs down the bark, or drips onto lower branches or the ground, and then hardens into a white crust. The lesions associated with this pathogen typically go visibly unnoticed on infected host trees for several years, due to the diseased tissue being held in place by resin. The formation of callus at canker margins is subtle or nearly absent, usually resin is the only indication of an underlying bark lesion. Cankers formed on the trunk will eventually appear as sunken due to living tissues (callus) expanding and growing around the wounded tissues. Complete girdling of the host trunk or large limbs may occur; however, this event may take several years to even decades to accomplish. In other susceptible conifers, symptoms are similar to those of spruce except resin exudation is usually less prominent. Regarding pines the key symptom to note is the inconspicuous branch cankers caused by this pathogen.

== Signs ==
Signs of Leucostoma kunzei include the fungal stromata of its Cytospora stage which form annually in recently killed bark of cankers and more abundantly, outside of girdling cankers. Pycnidial stromata are shaped like short cones, 1-2 mm in diameter, with fertile chambers radiating from the center and opening through a common pore at the top. During moist conditions, they will produce yellow tendrils of conidia. An individual stroma however, only does this once. Conidia are unicellular, allantoid (sausage shaped), and 4-6 x 0.5-1 μm in size. Perithecial stromata which mature in spring are also short conic and 1–2 mm in diameter. The interior tissue is pale yellow to grayish brown with 5-30 black perithecia embedded within. Perithecia are 200-600 μm in diameter, and their necks converge at the disc-like top of the stroma. The disc is usually 0.2-1.0 mm in diameter and gray to black on the surface. The ascospores are hyaline (colorless), unicellular, curved, and measure 5-8 x 1-2 μm.

== Disease cycle ==
Infection is initiated by the pathogen entering into the recent wounds of a susceptible host tree. These wounds can be created by mechanical means such as tools, via insect entry, or in natural wounds due to environmental stress factors such as snow or ice. Generally, most infection is thought to occur in the early spring, although spring my also renew latent infections from the previous season, once environmental conditions are advantageous to the fungus. Typically, unfavorable environmental conditions such as drought, high temperatures, or site specific stresses favor development and infection of this disease. This pathogen can be found in outer bark of what appear to be healthy branches, which indicates latent infection may occur prior to lesion development. Both the conidia and ascospores of this fungus are infectious.

Conidia are released during wet weather conditions of spring, but also throughout summer and autumn. These conidia can withstand freezing temperatures, which aids in survival of this fungus, and conidia germinate at approximately 20-33°C. The optimal temperature for conidial germination and initial growth of the fungus is around 27 °C. The ascospores are also released in spring, as well as, early summer. Dispersal of conidiospores and ascospores via running or splashing water provides evidence for the year-to-year intensification and increasing progression of symptoms. Both spore types have also been found dispersed on the wind in the vicinity of diseased trees, yet the means of becoming airborne is still uncertain. There is speculation that this dispersal by air may in fact be due to spore release via rain droplets which become free in air as the droplets evaporate. The conidia are found to be more abundantly dispersed in water and air, in contrast to ascospores. These airborne spores, as well as, insects provide an explanation for the spread of this disease from tree to tree. Once a branch or stem of a susceptible host has been girdled, the pathogen will rapidly colonize large areas of bark beyond the site of girdling. Following this, the pathogen will produce numerous pycnidial and later perithecial stromata. The probable duration of this disease cycle is 1 year, due to pycnidial stromata which form within the first year of lesion enlargement.

== Disease management ==
Due to older, weakened trees being most susceptible to Leucostoma kunzei, the key factor in proper management of this disease is maintenance of tree health and vigor by reducing stress on the tree. Choose planting sites with good, moist, well-drained soils; avoid shallow or excessively drained soils. During periods of prolonged drought or on dry sites regular watering is important during the growing season, as well as, the application of fertilizers every few years. Well-established trees and avoidance of any disturbance to the root system that may result in root injury or poor root growth both reduce likelihood of individual trees becoming diseased.

Selective pruning of lower branches where possible, without completely destroying the aesthetic appearance of the tree is advisable. On less severely cankered trees, all diseased and adjacent branches should be pruned back to the nearest living lateral branch or the trunk. Weak and injured branches should be cut to the trunk of the tree. On major limbs or trunks the cankered portion may be excised. This may be done by removing all brown, dead tissues, as well as, 1 inch of healthy bark and wood on all sides, cutting to a depth of ¼ inch. Proper sanitization of tools is crucial in prevention of accidental spread of this disease; this may be done by disinfecting them by either swabbing or immersing them in a solution of 70% rubbing alcohol. Pruning during wet conditions can potentially increase incidence of disease spread through pruning wounds; therefore, prune only when the foliage and bark are dry. Severely cankered trees cannot be restored to good health and should be completely removed from the site and if possible, burned to remove the source of inoculum.

To date, there have been no fungicides which have been able to provide prevention or arrest the development of Leucostoma canker on spruce trees

== Suggested replacement species (hardiness varieties) ==
- Siberian Spruce Picea omorika
- Blue Atlas Cedar Cedrus atlantica
- Nikko Fir Abies homolepis
- Leyland Cypress Cupressus leylandii
- Chinese Juniper Juniperus chinensis
- Rocky Mountain Juniper Juniperus scopulorum
- Japanese Cedar Cryptomeria japonica
