= Cytospora platani =

Scientific classification
- Kingdom: Fungi
- Division: Ascomycota
- Class: Sordariomycetes
- Order: Diaporthales
- Family: Valsaceae
- Genus: Cytospora
- Species: C. platani

Binomial name
- Cytospora platani Fuckel, (1860)

Species of fungus

Cytospora platani is a plant pathogen that causes cankers on Platanus sp. (American sycamores).
