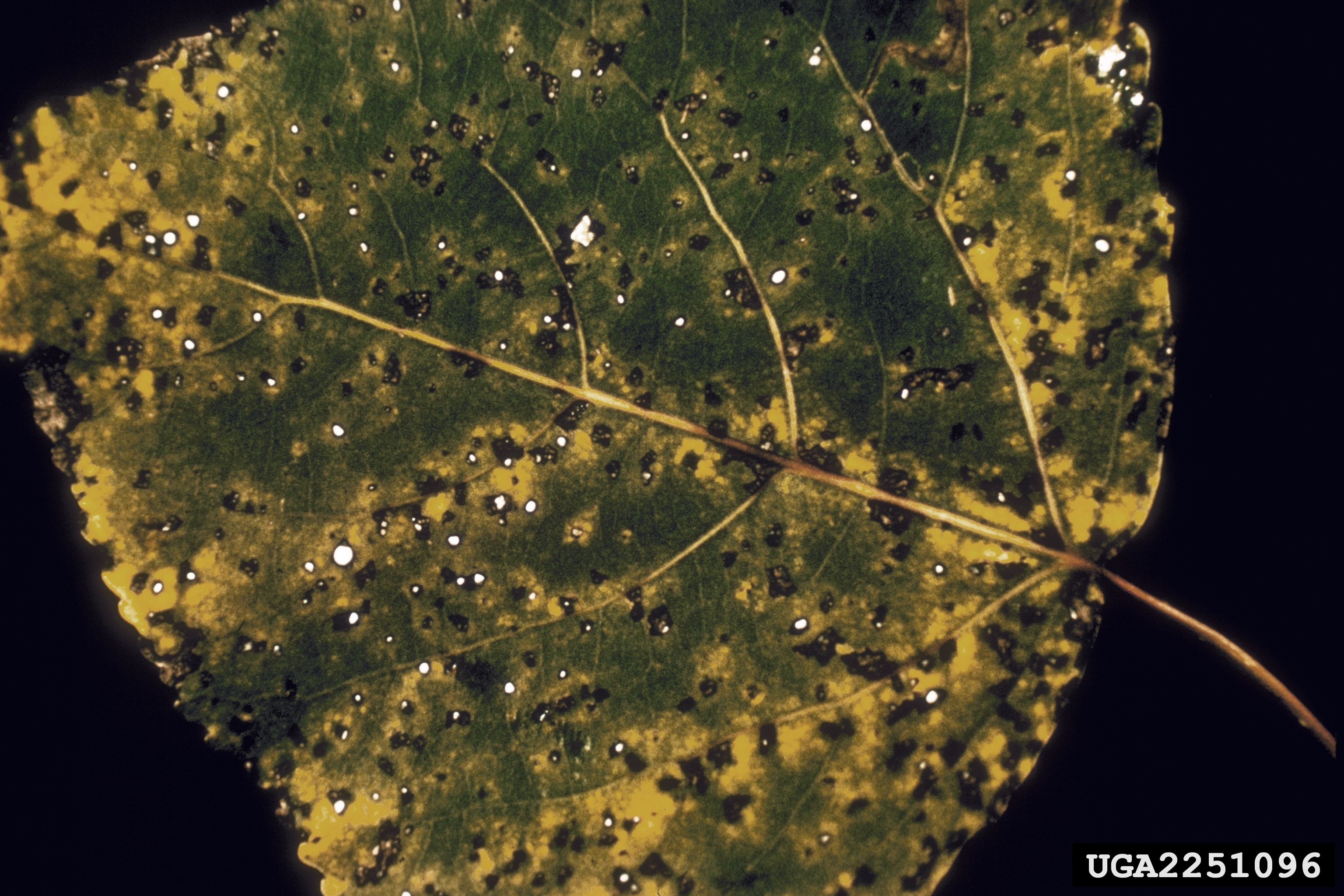
- Spores of Melampsora medusae on Populus deltoides

Scientific classification
- Domain: Eukaryota
- Kingdom: Fungi
- Division: Basidiomycota
- Class: Pucciniomycetes
- Order: Pucciniales
- Family: Melampsoraceae
- Genus: Melampsora
- Species: M. medusae

Binomial name
- Melampsora medusae Thüm., (1878)

Synonyms
- Melampsora albertensis Arthur, (1906); Uredo medusae (Thüm.) Arthur, (1906)

= Melampsora medusae =

Species of fungus

Melampsora medusae is a fungal pathogen, causing a disease of woody plants. The infected trees' leaves turn yellowish-orange. The disease affects mostly conifers, e.g. the Douglas-fir, western larch, tamarack, ponderosa, and lodgepole pine trees, but also some broadleaves, e.g. trembling aspen and poplars. Coniferous hosts are affected in late spring through early August, and trembling aspens and poplars from early summer to late fall. It is one of only two foliage rusts that occur naturally in British Columbia.

== Life cycle ==
Symptoms usually are contained to a single year on conifers, shedding the affected needles in fall. To survive the winter Melampsora medusae remain as teliospores on the dead leaves of the host, coming back in the spring to be spread by the wind as basidiospores, and infecting new conifers. After about two weeks, aeciospores are produced on the coniferous needles. Those spores serve as inoculum for an infection in live trembling aspen and other poplar trees in another two weeks. Urediniospores are produced on the poplar leaves, where the infection spreads. Winter then comes, and the cycle begins again.

== Bibliography ==
- Brown, J.S. (1984) Recent invasions of Australia and New Zealand by pathogenic fungi and counter measures. Bulletin OEPP/EPPO Bulletin 14, 417-428.
- CMI (1991) Distribution Maps of Plant Diseases No. 547 (edition 2). CAB International, Wallingford, UK.
- Hepting, G.H. (1971) Diseases of forest and shade trees of the United States. Agricultural handbook No. 386, pp. 209, 212, 299, 382, 387. Forest Service, US Department of Agriculture, USA.
- Kraayenoord, C.W.S. van; Laudon, G.F.; Spies, A.G. (1974) Poplar rusts invade New Zealand. Plant Disease Reporter 58, 423-427.
- McBride, R.P. (1965) A microbiological control of Melampsora medusae. Canadian Journal of Botany 47, 711-715.
- McMillan, R. (1972) Poplar leaf rust hazard. New Zealand Journal of Agriculture 125, 47.
- Nagarajan, S.; Singh, D.V. (1990) Long-distance dispersion of rust pathogens. Annual Review of Plant Pathology 28, 139-153.
- OEPP/EPPO (1982) Data sheets on quarantine organisms No. 33, Melampsora medusae. Bulletin OEPP/EPPO Bulletin 12 (1).
- OEPP/EPPO (1990) Specific quarantine requirements. EPPO Technical Documents No. 1008.
- Pinon, J. (1986) Situation de Melampsora medusae en Europe. Bulletin OEPP/EPPO Bulletin 16, 547-551.
- Prakash, C.S.; Heather, W.A. (1985) Adaption of Melampsora medusae to increasing temperature and light intensities on a clone of Populus deltoides. Canadian Journal of Botany 64, 834-841.
- Prakash, C.S.; Heather, W.A. (1989) Inheritance of partial resistance to two races of leaf rust Melampsora medusae in eastern cottonwood, Populus deltoides. Silvae Genetica 38, 90-94.
- Prakash, C.S.; Thielges, B.A. (1987) Pathogenic variation in Melampsora medusae leaf rust of poplars. Euphytica 36, 563-570.
- Prakash, C.S.; Thielges, B.A. (1989) Interaction of geographic isolates of Melampsora medusae and Populus: effect of temperature. Canadian Journal of Botany 67, 486-490.
- Schipper, A.L., Jr.; Dawson, D.H. (1974) Poplar leaf rust - a problem in maximum wood production. Plant Disease Reporter 58, 721-723.
- Shain, L. (1988) Evidence for formae speciales in poplar leaf rust fungus Melampsora medusae. Mycologia 80, 729-732.
- Sharma, J.K.; Heather, W.A. (1977) Infection of Populus alba var. hickeliana by Melampsora medusae Thüm. European Journal of Forest Pathology 7, 119-124.
- Siwecky, R. (1974) The mechanism of poplar leaf resistance to fungal infection. Polish Academy of Sciences, Annual Report, 1973, 32 pp.
- Spiers, A.G.; Hopcroft, D.H. (1985) Ultrastructural studies of pathogenesis and uredinial development of Melampsora larici-populina and M. medusae on poplar and M. coleosporioides and M. epitea on willow. New Zealand Journal of Botany 23, 117-133.
- Spiers, A.G.; Hopcroft, D.H. (1988) Penetration and infection of poplar leaves by urediniospores of Melampsora larici-populina and Melampsora medusae. New Zealand Journal of Botany 26, 101-111.
- Trench, T.N.; Baxter, A.P.; Churchill, H. (1987) Report of Melampsora medusae on Populus deltoides in Southern Africa. Plant Disease 71, 761.
- Walker, J. (1975) Melampsora medusae. CMI Descriptions of Pathogenic Fungi and Bacteria No. 480. CAB International, Wallingford, UK.
- Walker, J.; Hartigan, D. (1972) Poplar rust in Australia. Australian Plant Pathology Society Newsletter 1, 3.
- Ziller, W.G. (1955) Studies of western tree rusts. II. Melampsora occidentalis and M. albertensis, two needle rusts of Douglas-fir. Canadian Journal of Botany 33, 177-188.
- Ziller, W.G. (1965) Studies of western tree rusts. VI. The aecial host ranges of Melampsora albertensis, M. medusae and M. occidentalis. Canadian Journal of Botany 43, 217-230.
- Ziller, W.G. (1974) The tree rusts of western Canada. Forest Service, British Columbia, Canada, Publications No. 1329, pp. 144–147. Forest Service, British Columbia, Canada.
