= Valsa abietis =

Scientific classification
- Kingdom: Fungi
- Division: Ascomycota
- Class: Sordariomycetes
- Order: Diaporthales
- Family: Valsaceae
- Genus: Valsa
- Species: V. abietis

Binomial name
- Valsa abietis Nitschke, (1867)

Synonyms
- Cytospora abietis Sacc., Syll. fung. (Abellini) 3: 269 (1884); Cytospora pinastri Fr., Syst. mycol. (Lundae) 2(2): 544 (1823); Sphaeria abietis Fr., K. svenska Vetensk-Akad. Handl. 38: 96 (1817); Sphaeria friesii Duby; Valsa abietis Fr., Summa veg. Scand., Section Post. (Stockholm): 412 (1849); Valsa cenisia De Not., (1863); Valsa friesii (Duby) Fuckel, Jb. nassau. Ver. Naturk. 23-24: 198 (1870); Valsa friesii Nitschke, (1870)

Species of fungus

Valsa abietis is a plant pathogen infecting Douglas-firs.

== See also ==
- List of Douglas-fir diseases
