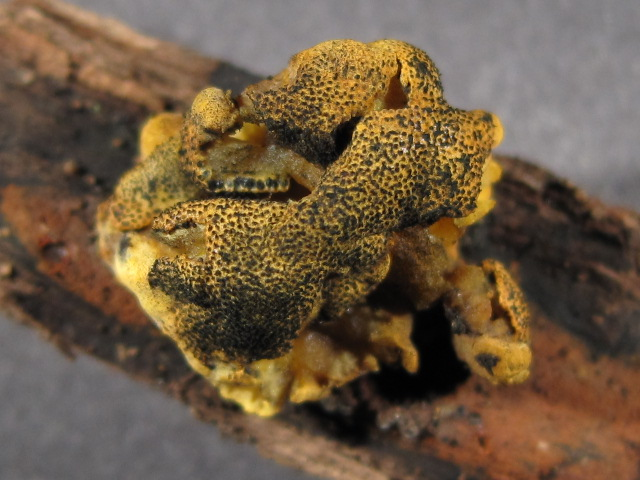
- Ascocarp of Thuemenella cubispora

Scientific classification
- Kingdom: Fungi
- Division: Ascomycota
- Class: Sordariomycetes
- Order: Xylariales
- Family: Hypoxylaceae
- Genus: Thuemenella; Penz. & Sacc. (1898)

Type species
- Thuemenella javanica Penz. & Sacc. (1898)

Synonyms
- Chromocreopsis Seaver (1910)

= Thuemenella =

Genus of fungi

Thuemenella is a genus of fungi in the family Hypoxylaceae. The genus was circumscribed in 1898 by Albert Julius Otto Penzig and Pier Andrea Saccardo.

The genus name of Thuemenella is in honour of Felix von Thümen (1839–1892), who was a German botanist and mycologist.

== Species ==
As accepted by Species Fungorum;

- Thuemenella cubispora (Ellis & Holw.) Boedijn (1964)
- Thuemenella hirsuta (Ellis & Everh.) Boedijn (1964)
- Thuemenella javanica Penz. & Sacc. (1898)

Former species;

- Thuemenella bicolor (Ellis & Everh.) Boedijn (1964) = Sarawakus bicolor, Hypocreaceae
- Thuemenella britannica Rifai & J. Webster (1965) = Trichoderma britannicum, Hypocreaceae
- Thuemenella fragilis Yoshim. Doi (1972) = Trichoderma fragile, Hypocreaceae
- Thuemenella hexaspora Boedijn (1964) = Trichoderma hexasporum, Hypocreaceae
- Thuemenella izawae Yoshim. Doi (1975) = Trichoderma izawae, Hypocreaceae
- Thuemenella sordida Yoshim. Doi (1972) = Trichoderma sordidum, Hypocreaceae
- Thuemenella trachycarpa (Syd.) Dennis (1970) = Trichoderma trachycarpum, Hypocreaceae
