= Amphiporthe =

Scientific classification
- Kingdom: Fungi
- Division: Ascomycota
- Class: Sordariomycetes
- Order: Diaporthales
- Family: Valsaceae
- Genus: Amphiporthe; Petr.

Type species
- Amphiporthe hranicensis (Petr.) Petr.

Genus of fungi

Amphiporthe is a genus of fungi within the family Valsaceae.
