= Apioplagiostoma =

Scientific classification
- Kingdom: Fungi
- Division: Ascomycota
- Class: Sordariomycetes
- Order: Diaporthales
- Family: Valsaceae
- Genus: Apioplagiostoma; M.E. Barr

Type species
- Apioplagiostoma populi (E.K. Cash & Waterman) M.E. Barr

Genus of fungi

Apioplagiostoma is a genus of fungi within the family Valsaceae.
