= Durispora =

Scientific classification
- Kingdom: Fungi
- Division: Ascomycota
- Class: Sordariomycetes
- Order: Diaporthales
- Family: Valsaceae
- Genus: Durispora; K.D.Hyde (1994)

Type species
- Durispora elaeidicola K.D.Hyde (1994)

Species
- D. elaeidicola D. musae

Genus of fungi

Durispora is a genus of fungi in the family Valsaceae.
