= Valsella =

Scientific classification
- Domain: Eukaryota
- Kingdom: Fungi
- Division: Ascomycota
- Class: Sordariomycetes
- Order: Diaporthales
- Family: Valsaceae
- Genus: Valsella

Genus of fungi

Valsella is a genus of fungi within the family Valsaceae.
