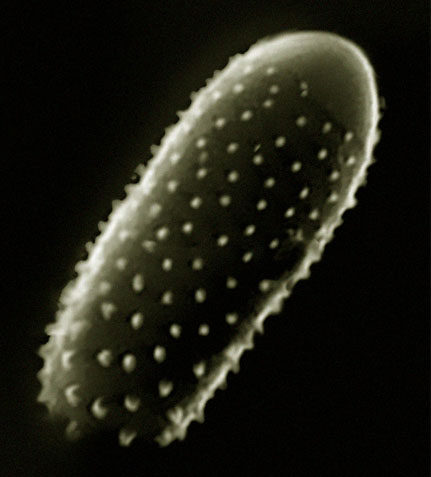
- Uredospore of Melampsora sp.

Scientific classification
- Kingdom: Fungi
- Division: Basidiomycota
- Class: Pucciniomycetes
- Order: Pucciniales
- Family: Melampsoraceae
- Genus: Melampsora; Castagne

Species
- See text

= Melampsora =

Genus of fungi

Melampsora is a genus of Basidiomycota fungi. Melampsora species are plant pathogens.

== Species ==
The following species are recognised in the genus Melampsora:

- Melampsora ×columbiana
- Melampsora ×medusae-populina
- Melampsora abietis-canadensis
- Melampsora abietis-caprearum
- Melampsora abietis-populi
- Melampsora acalyphae
- Melampsora aleuritis
- Melampsora allii-fragilis
- Melampsora allii-populina
- Melampsora americana
- Melampsora amygdalinae
- Melampsora apocyni
- Melampsora arctica
- Melampsora ari-salicina
- Melampsora berberifoliae
- Melampsora bigelowii
- Melampsora caballeroi
- Melampsora caprearum
- Melampsora castellana
- Melampsora chelidonii-pierotii
- Melampsora choseniae
- Melampsora coleosporioides
- Melampsora confluens
- Melampsora daphnicola
- Melampsora dimorphospora
- Melampsora dupiasii
- Melampsora durrieui
- Melampsora epiphylla
- Melampsora epitea
- Melampsora euonymi-incanae
- Melampsora euphorbiae
- Melampsora euphorbiae-amygdaloidis
- Melampsora euphorbiae-engleri
- Melampsora euphorbiae-exiguae
- Melampsora euphorbiae-geniculatae
- Melampsora euphorbiae-pepli
- Melampsora euphorbiae-pilosae
- Melampsora euphorbiae-strictae
- Melampsora euphorbiae-sulcatae
- Melampsora farlowii
- Melampsora ferrinii
- Melampsora galanthi-fragilis
- Melampsora geniculata
- Melampsora geniculatae
- Melampsora graeca
- Melampsora hirculi
- Melampsora hissarica
- Melampsora humboldtiana
- Melampsora humilis
- Melampsora hyperici-sampsonii
- Melampsora hypericorum
- Melampsora idesiae
- Melampsora iranica
- Melampsora junodii
- Melampsora kamikotica
- Melampsora kiusiana
- Melampsora kupreviczii
- Melampsora kusanoi
- Melampsora lapponum
- Melampsora laricis-daphnoidis
- Melampsora laricis-nigricantis
- Melampsora laricis-pentandrae
- Melampsora laricis-populina
- Melampsora laricis-purpureae
- Melampsora laricis-reticulatae
- Melampsora laricis-urbanianae
- Melampsora linearis
- Melampsora lini - flax rust
- Melampsora magnusiana
- Melampsora medusae
- Melampsora medusae-populina
- Melampsora microsora
- Melampsora microspora
- Melampsora monticola
- Melampsora multa
- Melampsora mundkurii
- Melampsora novae-zelandiae
- Melampsora oblonga
- Melampsora occidentalis
- Melampsora osmaniensis
- Melampsora pakistanica
- Melampsora paradoxa
- Melampsora periplocae
- Melampsora piscariae
- Melampsora populnea
- Melampsora pruinosae
- Melampsora pulcherrima
- Melampsora ribis
- Melampsora ribis-auritae
- Melampsora ribis-epitea
- Melampsora ribis-grandifoliae
- Melampsora ribis-viminalis
- Melampsora rostrupii
- Melampsora salacis-viminalis
- Melampsora salicis-albae
- Melampsora salicis-argyraceae
- Melampsora salicis-bakko
- Melampsora salicis-cavaleriei
- Melampsora salicis-cupularis
- Melampsora salicis-delavayanae
- Melampsora salicis-futurae
- Melampsora salicis-michelsonii
- Melampsora salicis-polyadeniae
- Melampsora salicis-purpureae
- Melampsora salicis-reinii
- Melampsora salicis-sinicae
- Melampsora salicis-triandrae
- Melampsora salicis-wallichianae
- Melampsora salicis-warburgii
- Melampsora sancti-johannis
- Melampsora serissicola
- Melampsora stellerae
- Melampsora stereospermi
- Melampsora tsinlingensis
- Melampsora vernalis
- Melampsora yezoensis
- Melampsora yoshinagae
