= Diaporthella =

Scientific classification
- Kingdom: Fungi
- Division: Ascomycota
- Class: Sordariomycetes
- Order: Diaporthales
- Family: Valsaceae
- Genus: Diaporthella; Petr.

Type species
- Diaporthella aristata (Fr.) Petr.

Species
- D. aristata D. corylina D. cristata D. platasca D. sphendamnina

Genus of fungi

Diaporthella is a genus of fungi in the family Valsaceae.
