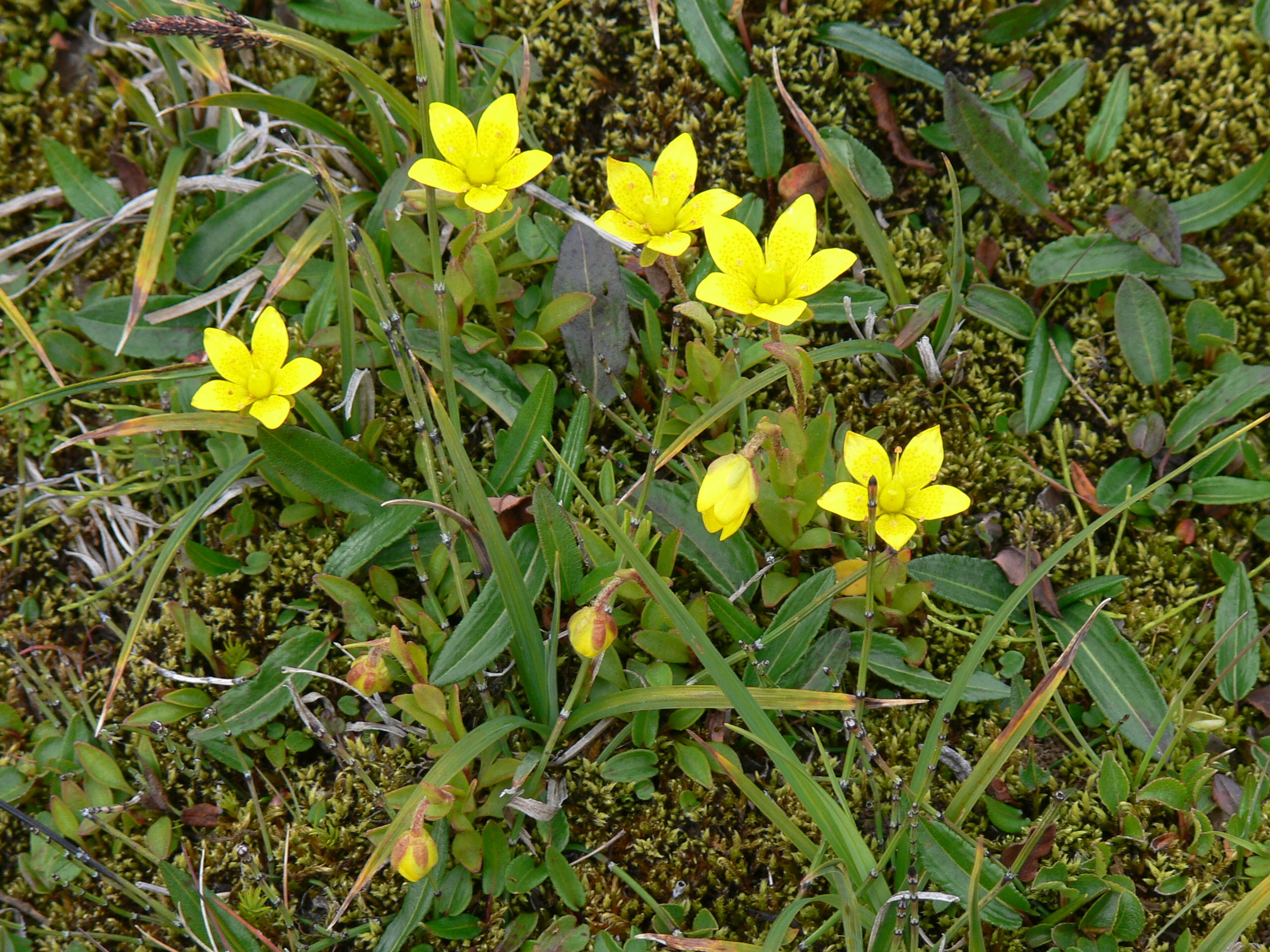

Conservation status
- Least Concern (IUCN 3.1)

Scientific classification
- Kingdom: Plantae
- Clade: Tracheophytes
- Clade: Angiosperms
- Clade: Eudicots
- Order: Saxifragales
- Family: Saxifragaceae
- Genus: Saxifraga
- Species: S. hirculus

Binomial name
- Saxifraga hirculus L.

= Saxifraga hirculus =

Species of herb

Saxifraga hirculus is a species of saxifrage, commonly called marsh saxifrage, yellow marsh saxifrage, or bog saxifrage. It is a perennial herb with yellow flowers and red stem, 5–30 cm high, found on bog landscape.

Saxifraga hirculus is a known food source for the generalist fungus species Mycosphaerella tassiana and the pathogenic fungus species Melampsora hirculi.
