= Hypospilina =

Scientific classification
- Kingdom: Fungi
- Division: Ascomycota
- Class: Sordariomycetes
- Order: Diaporthales
- Family: Valsaceae
- Genus: Hypospilina (Sacc.) Traverso

Type species
- Hypospilina bifrons (DC.) Traverso

Genus of fungi

Hypospilina is a genus of fungi within the family Valsaceae.
