= Phruensis =

Scientific classification
- Kingdom: Fungi
- Division: Ascomycota
- Class: Sordariomycetes
- Order: Diaporthales
- Family: Valsaceae
- Genus: Phruensis; Pinruan

Type species
- Phruensis brunneispora Pinruan (2004)

Genus of fungi

Phruensis is a fungal genus in the family Valsaceae. It is monotypic, containing the single species Phruensis brunneispora, found on decaying trunks of the palm Licuala longecalycata in Thailand. The species was described as new to science in 2004.
