= Rossmania =

Scientific classification
- Kingdom: Fungi
- Division: Ascomycota
- Class: Sordariomycetes
- Order: Diaporthales
- Family: Valsaceae
- Genus: Rossmania; Lar.N. Vassiljeva (2001)

Type species
- Rossmania ukurunduensis Lar.N. Vassiljeva (2001)

Species
- R. aculeata R. ukurunduensis

Genus of fungi

Rossmania is a genus of fungi within the family Valsaceae.
