= Maculatipalma =

Scientific classification
- Kingdom: Fungi
- Division: Ascomycota
- Class: Sordariomycetes
- Order: Diaporthales
- Family: Valsaceae
- Genus: Maculatipalma; J.Fröhl. & K.D.Hyde (1995)

Type species
- Maculatipalma frondicola J. Fröhl. & K.D.Hyde (1995)

Genus of fungi

Maculatipalma is a fungal genus in the family Valsaceae. This is a monotypic genus, containing the single species Maculatipalma frondicola, originally discovered growing on a leaf of Linospadix microcaryus in Queensland.
