= Cryptascoma =

Scientific classification
- Kingdom: Fungi
- Division: Ascomycota
- Class: Sordariomycetes
- Order: Diaporthales
- Family: Valsaceae
- Genus: Cryptascoma; Ananthap. (1988)

Type species
- Cryptascoma bisetula Ananthap. (1988)

Genus of fungi

Cryptascoma is a fungal genus in the family Valsaceae. This is a monotypic genus, containing the single species Cryptascoma bisetula.
