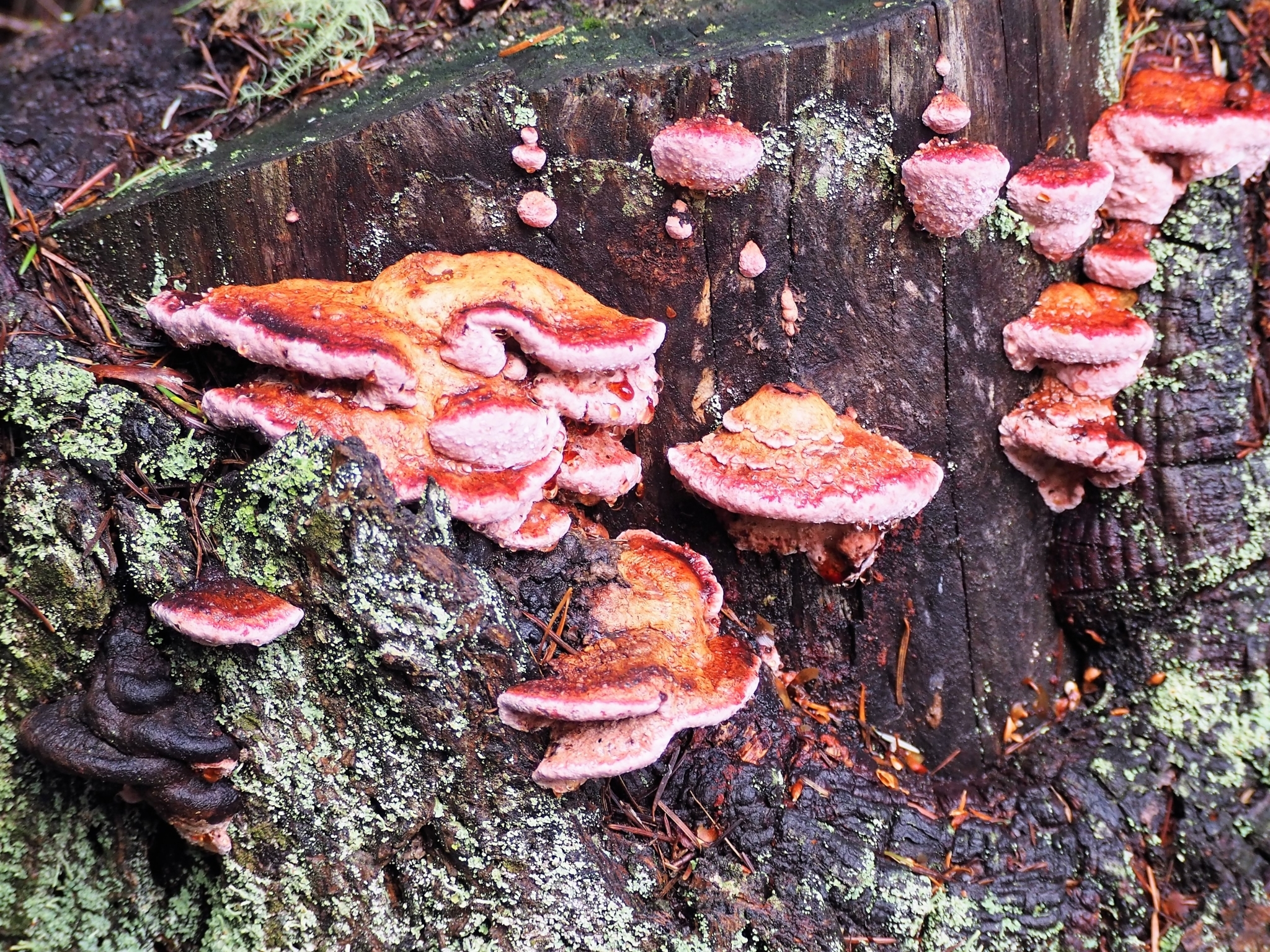

Scientific classification
- Kingdom: Fungi
- Division: Basidiomycota
- Class: Agaricomycetes
- Order: Polyporales
- Genus: Rhodofomes
- Species: R. cajanderi

Binomial name
- Rhodofomes cajanderi (P.Karst.) B.K. Cui, M.L. Han & Y.C. Dai (2016)

Synonyms
- List: Fomes cajanderi P.Karst. (1904); Fomes subroseus (Weir) Overh. (1935); Fomitopsis cajanderi (P.Karst.) Kotl. & Pouzar (1957); Fomitopsis roseozonata (Lloyd) S. Ito, (1955); Fomitopsis subrosea (Weir) Bondartsev & Singer (1941); Polystictus mimicus (P.Karst.) Sacc. & Trotter (1912); Pycnoporus mimicus P.Karst. (1906); Trametes roseozonata Lloyd (1922); Trametes subrosea Weir (1923); Ungulina subrosea (Weir) Murashk. (1939)

= Rhodofomes cajanderi =

Species of fungus

Rhodofomes cajanderi is a widely distributed species of bracket fungus. Commonly known as the rosy conk due to its rose-colored pore surface, it causes a disease called a brown pocket rot in various conifer species.

== Description ==
Rhodofomes cajanderi is a perennial shelf fungus. It may be identified by its small-to-medium-sized, fleshy, tough fruit-body, with a downy or crust-like top. It grows to around 3–10 cm (1.2–3.9 in) wide. The top surface is a pink colour becoming to grey, brown, or black, with a clear margin.

The inside of the conk and the bottom are a rosy pink colour. The body of the fungus is rigid and can grow up to 1 cm thick. There are 3–5 round pores per millimeter. It produces a whitish spore print. It is inedible.

=== Similar species ===
This species of polypore is morphologically similar to its relative, Rhodofomes roseus. Other similar species include Fomitopsis pinicola, Ganoderma lucidum, G. oregonense, and Rhodonia placenta.

== Distribution and habitat ==
It is widespread in western North America, with more prevalence in southern climates. It has a particular preference for higher-altitude spruce forests.

== See also ==
- List of apricot diseases
- List of peach and nectarine diseases
- List of Douglas-fir diseases
