= Melampsora occidentalis =

Scientific classification
- Domain: Eukaryota
- Kingdom: Fungi
- Division: Basidiomycota
- Class: Pucciniomycetes
- Order: Pucciniales
- Family: Melampsoraceae
- Genus: Melampsora
- Species: M. occidentalis

Binomial name
- Melampsora occidentalis H.S. Jacks. (1917)

Species of fungus

Melampsora occidentalis is a plant pathogen. It is a macrocyclic, heteroecious rust that alternates between poplars and conifers.
