= Chadefaudiomyces =

Scientific classification
- Kingdom: Fungi
- Division: Ascomycota
- Class: Sordariomycetes
- Order: Diaporthales
- Family: Valsaceae
- Genus: Chadefaudiomyces; Kamat, V.G.Rao, A.S.Patil & Ullasa (1974)

Type species
- Chadefaudiomyces indicus Kamat, V.G.Rao, A.S.Patil & Ullasa (1974)

Genus of fungi

Chadefaudiomyces is a fungal genus in the family Valsaceae. This is a monotypic genus, containing the single species Chadefaudiomyces indicus.
