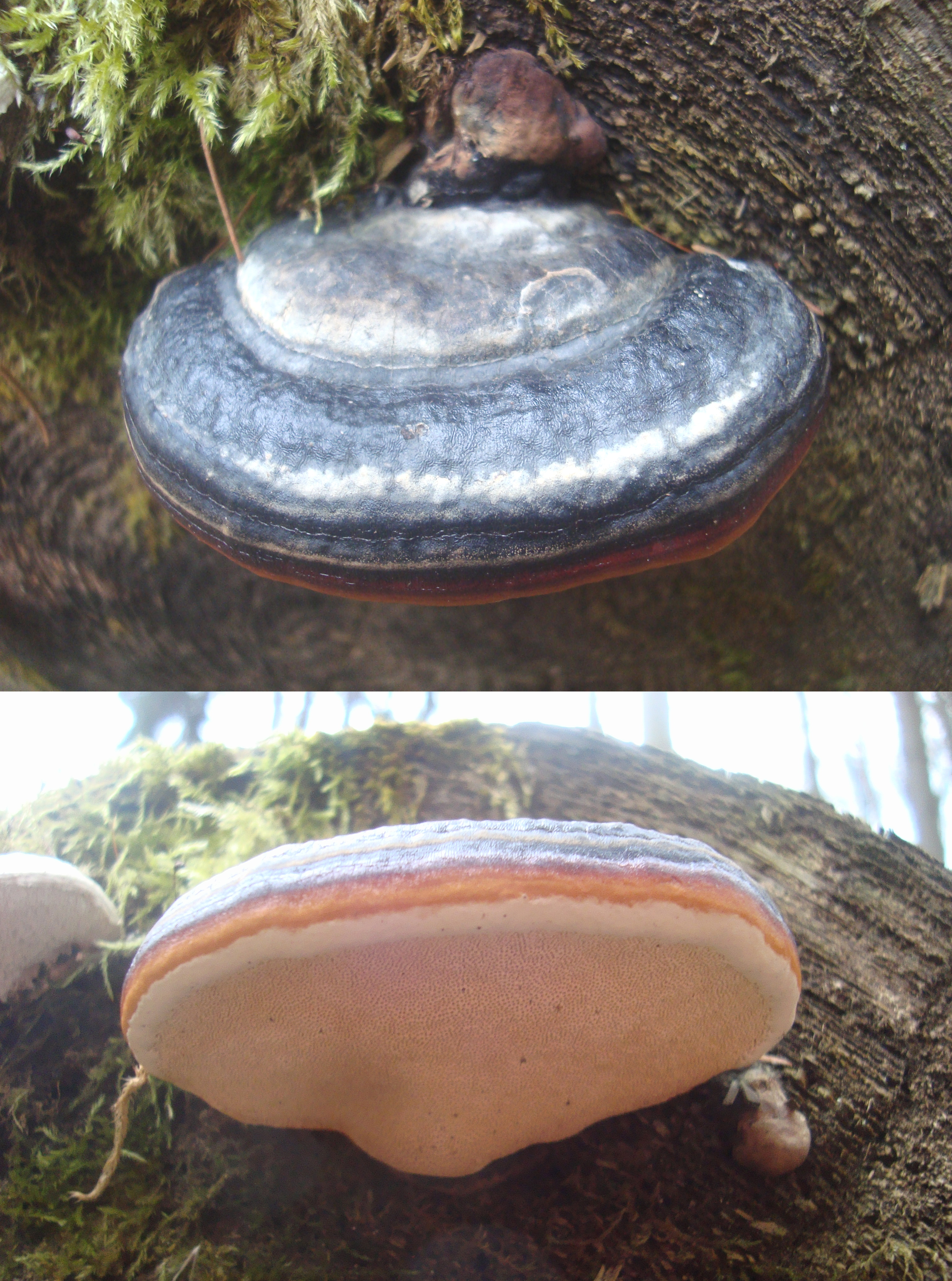

Scientific classification
- Kingdom: Fungi
- Division: Basidiomycota
- Class: Agaricomycetes
- Order: Polyporales
- Genus: Rhodofomes
- Species: R. roseus

Binomial name
- Rhodofomes roseus (Alb. & Schwein.) Kotl. & Pouzar (1990)

Synonyms
- List: Boletus roseus Alb. & Schwein. (1805); Fomes carneus Blume & T. Nees (1889); Fomitopsis rosea (Alb. & Schwein.) P. Karst. (1881); Fomes roseus (Alb. & Schwein.) Fr. (1888); Fomes rufopallidus (Trog) Cooke (1885); Fomitopsis carnea (Blume & T. Nees) Imazeki (1943); Fomitopsis rufopallida (Trog) P. Karst. (1881); Placodes roseus (Alb. & Schwein.) Quél. (1886); Polyporus roseus (Alb. & Schwein.) Fr. (1818); Polyporus rufopallidus Trog (1832); Scindalma carneum (Blume & T. Nees) Kuntze (1898); Scindalma roseum (Alb. & Schwein.) Kuntze (1898); Scindalma rufopallidum (Trog) Kuntze (1898); Trametes carnea (Blume & T. Nees) Corner (1989); Trametes carnea (Blume & T. Nees) Lloyd (1915); Trametes rosea (Alb. & Schwein.) P. Karst. (1881); Ungulina rosea (Alb. & Schwein.) Pat. (1900)

= Rhodofomes roseus =

Type of fungus

Rhodofomes roseus is a species of pink polypore found in western North America and Europe. This is a close relative of another species of pink conk, the rosy conk (Rhodofomes cajanderi). While R. cajanderi is a plant pathogen, R. rosea is a detritivore.

== Habitat ==
Rhodofomes roseus grows in western North America, most often in spruce forests. Specimens from Vancouver Island, Prince George, and Wells Gray Park have helped characterize the species. This conk grows exclusively on dead wood, with a preference for logs of Picea, Pseudotsuga. or Populus species. It causes a brown cubical rot.

== Identification ==
Rhodofomes roseus is a perennial fungus. It is sessile, meaning it is immobile and attached at the base without the presence of a stalk or peduncle. It often grows in a hoof or fan shape, with a smooth surface. The top of the conk can be a pale pink fading to a grey or brown colour, while the bottom is a pale pink. The inside of the conk, known as the context, is fibrous and woody, and may have layers of brown or pink colour. It has round pores, with 3-5 pores per millimeter.

Rhodofomes roseus is thicker than its close relative, Rhodofomes cajanderi
