= Kapooria =

Scientific classification
- Kingdom: Fungi
- Division: Ascomycota
- Class: Sordariomycetes
- Order: Diaporthales
- Family: Valsaceae
- Genus: Kapooria; J.Reid & C.Booth (1989)

Type species
- Kapooria musarum (J.N.Kapoor) J.Reid & C.Booth (1989)

Genus of fungi

Kapooria is a fungal genus in the family Valsaceae. This is a monotypic genus, containing the single species Kapooria musarum, first described as Cryptosporella musarum by J. Kapoor in 1968.
