= Ditopellina =

Scientific classification
- Kingdom: Fungi
- Division: Ascomycota
- Class: Sordariomycetes
- Order: Diaporthales
- Family: Valsaceae
- Genus: Ditopellina; J.Reid & C.Booth (1967)

Type species
- Ditopellina saccardiana (Traverso & Spessa) J.Reid & C.Booth (1967)

Genus of fungi

Ditopellina is a genus of fungi in the family Valsaceae. This genus is monotypic, containing the single species Ditopellina saccardiana.
