= Phoma eupyrena =

Scientific classification
- Domain: Eukaryota
- Kingdom: Fungi
- Division: Ascomycota
- Class: Dothideomycetes
- Order: Pleosporales
- Family: Didymellaceae
- Genus: Phoma
- Species: P. eupyrena

Binomial name
- Phoma eupyrena Sacc. (1879)

Species of fungus

Phoma eupyrena is a fungal plant pathogen infecting Douglas firs.
