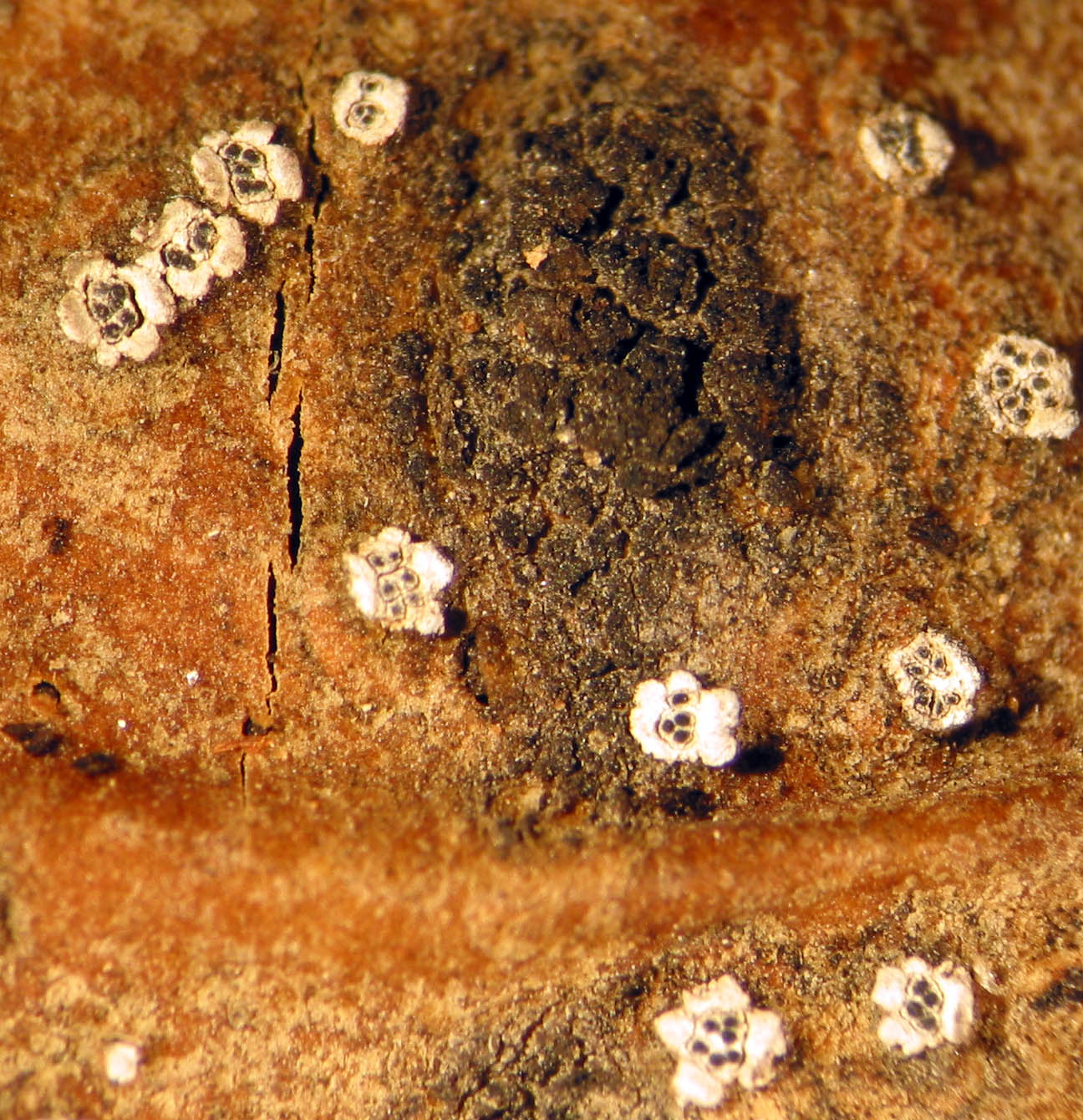
- Leucostoma pseudoniveum Lar.N. Vassiljeva

Scientific classification
- Kingdom: Fungi
- Division: Ascomycota
- Class: Sordariomycetes
- Order: Diaporthales
- Family: Valsaceae
- Genus: Leucostoma (Nitschke) Höhn (1917)

Type species
- Leucostoma massarianum (De Not.) Höhn. (1917)

Synonyms
- Valsa subgen. Leucostoma Nitschke (1870)

= Leucostoma (fungus) =

Genus of fungi

Leucostoma is a genus of fungi in the family Valsaceae.

== Species ==
- Leucostoma amphibola
- Leucostoma auerswaldii
- Leucostoma curreyi
- Leucostoma excipienda
- Leucostoma kunzei
- Leucostoma kuduerense
- Leucostoma persoonii
- Leucostoma mangiferae
- Leucostoma massarianum
- Leucostoma parapersoonii
- Leucostoma persoonii
- Leucostoma pseudoniveum
- Leucostoma sequoiae
- Leucostoma translucens
