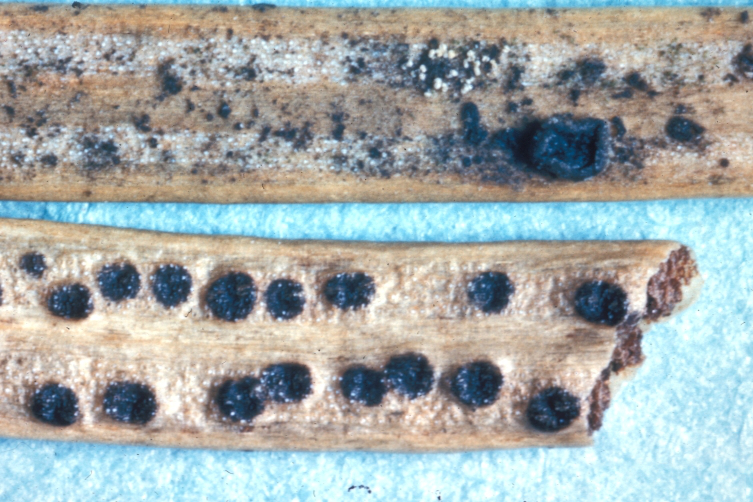
- Phacidium infestans on needles of Abies concolor

Scientific classification
- Kingdom: Fungi
- Division: Ascomycota
- Class: Leotiomycetes
- Order: Phacidiales
- Family: Phacidiaceae
- Genus: Phacidium
- Species: P. infestans

Binomial name
- Phacidium infestans P. Karst., (1888)

Synonyms
- Phacidium abietis (Dearn.) J. Reid & Cain, (1963); Phacidium infestans var. abietis Dearn., (1926); Phacidium lacerum f. pini-cembrae Rehm; Phacidium pini-cembrae (Rehm) Terrier,(1942)

= Phacidium infestans =

Species of fungus

Phacidium infestans is a fungal plant pathogen infecting Douglas-firs commonly known as snow/needle blight.
