= Paravalsa =

Scientific classification
- Kingdom: Fungi
- Division: Ascomycota
- Class: Sordariomycetes
- Order: Diaporthales
- Family: Valsaceae
- Genus: Paravalsa; Ananthap.

Type species
- Paravalsa indica Ananthap.

Genus of fungi

Paravalsa is a genus of fungi within the family Valsaceae. This is a monotypic genus, containing the single species Paravalsa indica.
