= Felix von Thümen =

German botanist and mycologist

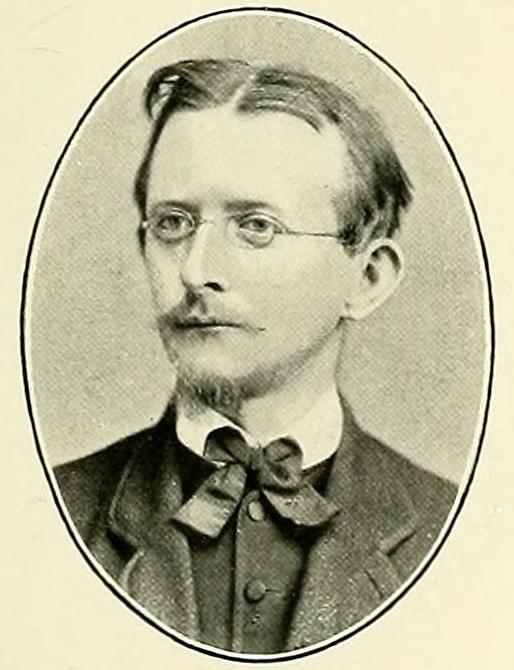
Felix von Thümen (1839-1892)

Felix Karl Albert Ernst Joachim Freiherr von Thümen (6 February 1839, Dresden – 13 October 1892 Teplitz-Schönau) was a German botanist and mycologist.

== Life ==
Felix von Thümen graduated from the Gymnasium in Dresden and entered the Prussian army at the age of 19, but soon retired due to an injury incurred by a fall from his horse. After a short stint in agriculture he had to abandon the management of his family estates and devoted the rest of his life to botanical and mycological research. Influenced mainly by Ludwig Reichenbach he devoted most of his interest to the study of fungi. In 1876 he became a research assistant at the chemico-physiological research station in Klosterneuburg, a position he occupied for the rest of his life. The position afforded him considerable freedom in choosing his domicile, so that he lived for various periods in Vienna, Berlin and Gorizia. He suffered from a severe heart disease, for which he repeatedly visited the spas of Teplitz-Schönau, where he died at the age of 54. He was a fellow of the Royal Prussian Academy of Science.

== Work ==
His early fame rested mainly on his morphological acumen, which resulted in him being sought out to provide systematic treatments of fungi made by a large number of botanical collectors in Austria, Bavaria, Portugal, Siberia, Egypt, South Africa, Australia, North America and Argentina. His interest later turned to plant pathology, in particular to fungal diseases of grapevines and fruit trees. Among a multitude of publications the more prominent are Fungi nonnulli austriaci, Fungi of the Grapevine, (1877) Fungi of the Fruitplants (1888). He published several exsiccata works, among them Fungi Austriaci, Herbarium mycologicum oeconomicum and Mycotheca universalis.

Botanists Albert Julius Otto Penzig and Pier Andrea Saccardo in 1898, circumscribed the fungi genus of Thuemenella, which was named in his honour.

== Sources ==
- E. Wunschmann., „Thümen, Felix“, in: Allgemeine Deutsche Biographie 54 (1908), pp. 702-703
- Obituary in Berichte der Deutschen Botanischen Gesellschaft 1893

== Bibliography ==
- Detailed bibliography on WorldCat
