= Jean Louis Martin Castagne =

Jean Louis Martin Castagne (11 November 1785, in Marseille – 17 March 1858, in Miramas) was a French botanist and mycologist.

He was born into a merchant family in Marseille, and as a young man he worked in the banking business in his hometown. In 1814 he relocated to Constantinople on behalf of family business, and in 1820 gained the post of deputy of commerce in Constantinople. In 1833 he returned to France, eventually settling in the city of Miramas, where in 1846 he was named mayor.

The brown algae genus Castagnea (Derbès and Solier, 1856) commemorates his name, as does the red algae species Polysiphonia castagnei (Kützing, 1863). Also Castagnella G.Arnaud 1914 (a type of Fungi).

== Principal works ==
- Observations sur quelques plantes acotylédonées de la famille des urédinées et dans les sous-tribus des némasporées et des aecidinées, 1842 – Observations on some acotyledon plants of the family Uredineae, etc.
- Catalogue des plantes qui croissent naturellement aux environs de Marseille, 1845 – Catalogue of plants native to the environs of Marseille.
- Catalogue des plantes qui croissent naturellement dans le département des Bouches-du-Rhône (with August Alphonse Derbès), 1862 – Catalogue of plants native to the département of Bouches-du-Rhône.
