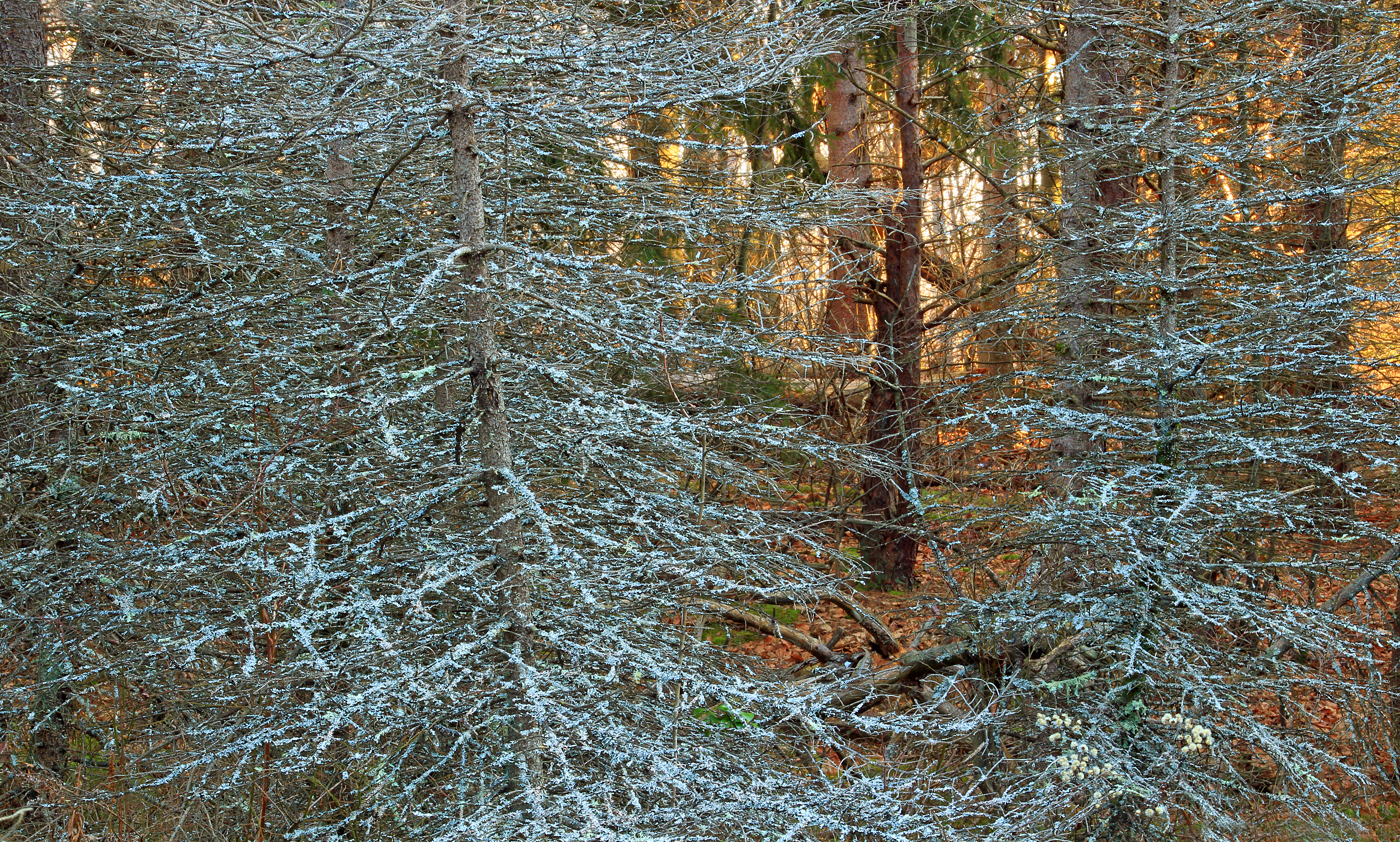
- Dead spruces that have succumbed to Cytospora canker found in McIntyre Wild Area, Loyalsock State Forest, Lycoming County, Pennsylvania. Resin oozes from the cankers, solidifying into a thick, whitish mass resembling snow or hoarfrost.

Scientific classification
- Kingdom: Fungi
- Division: Ascomycota
- Class: Sordariomycetes
- Order: Diaporthales
- Family: Valsaceae
- Genus: Cytospora; Ehrenb.

Species
- Species include: Cytospora elegans; Cytospora personata; Cytospora palmarum; Cytospora platani; Cytospora sacchari; Cytospora sacculus; Cytospora terebinthi

= Cytospora =

Genus of fungi

Cytospora is a genus of ascomycete fungi. The genus was first described in 1818 by Christian Gottfried Ehrenberg. Cytospora species are known as plant pathogens.

== Pathology ==
Cytospora canker was observed by G. B. Ouellette in all the plantations of white and Norway spruces examined in the Province of Quebec, as well as in some natural stands of indigenous spruce. Disease incidence was particularly high in the Grand-Mère and Saint-Lazare plantations where it had been present since at least 1943 and 1955, respectively. Periods favourable to infection had occurred at fairly regular intervals, and the aggressiveness of canker development varied year by year. Rainfall, temperature, and disease intensity were not clearly correlated.
