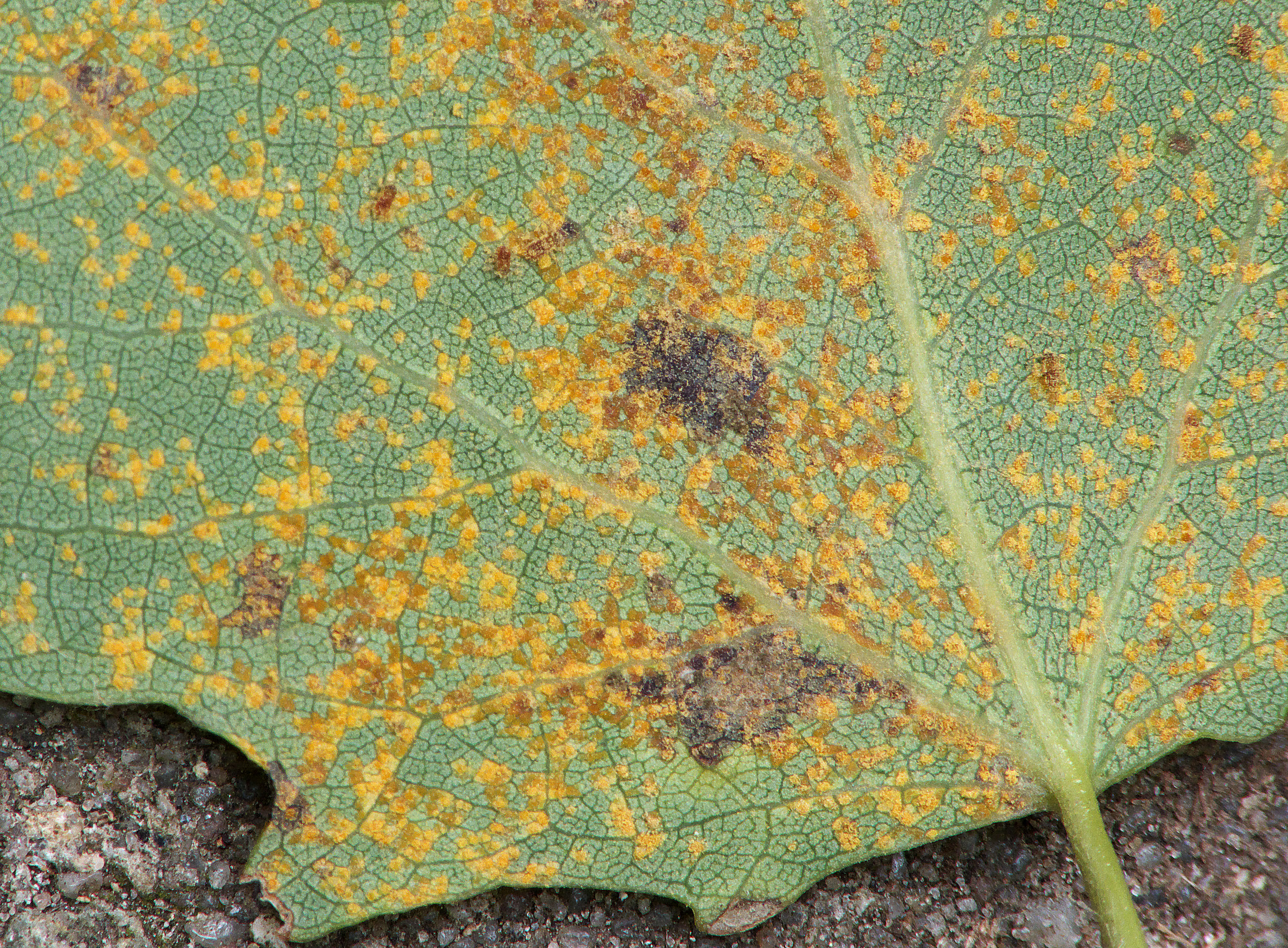
- Uredosori of Melampsora laricipopulina on a poplar leaf

Scientific classification
- Kingdom: Fungi
- Division: Basidiomycota
- Class: Pucciniomycetes
- Order: Pucciniales
- Family: Melampsoraceae; Dietel 1897

Genus
- Melampsora Castagne 1843

= Melampsoraceae =

Family of fungi

Melampsoraceae are a family of rust fungi in the order Pucciniales. The family is monotypic, containing the single genus Melampsora, which contains about 90 species.
