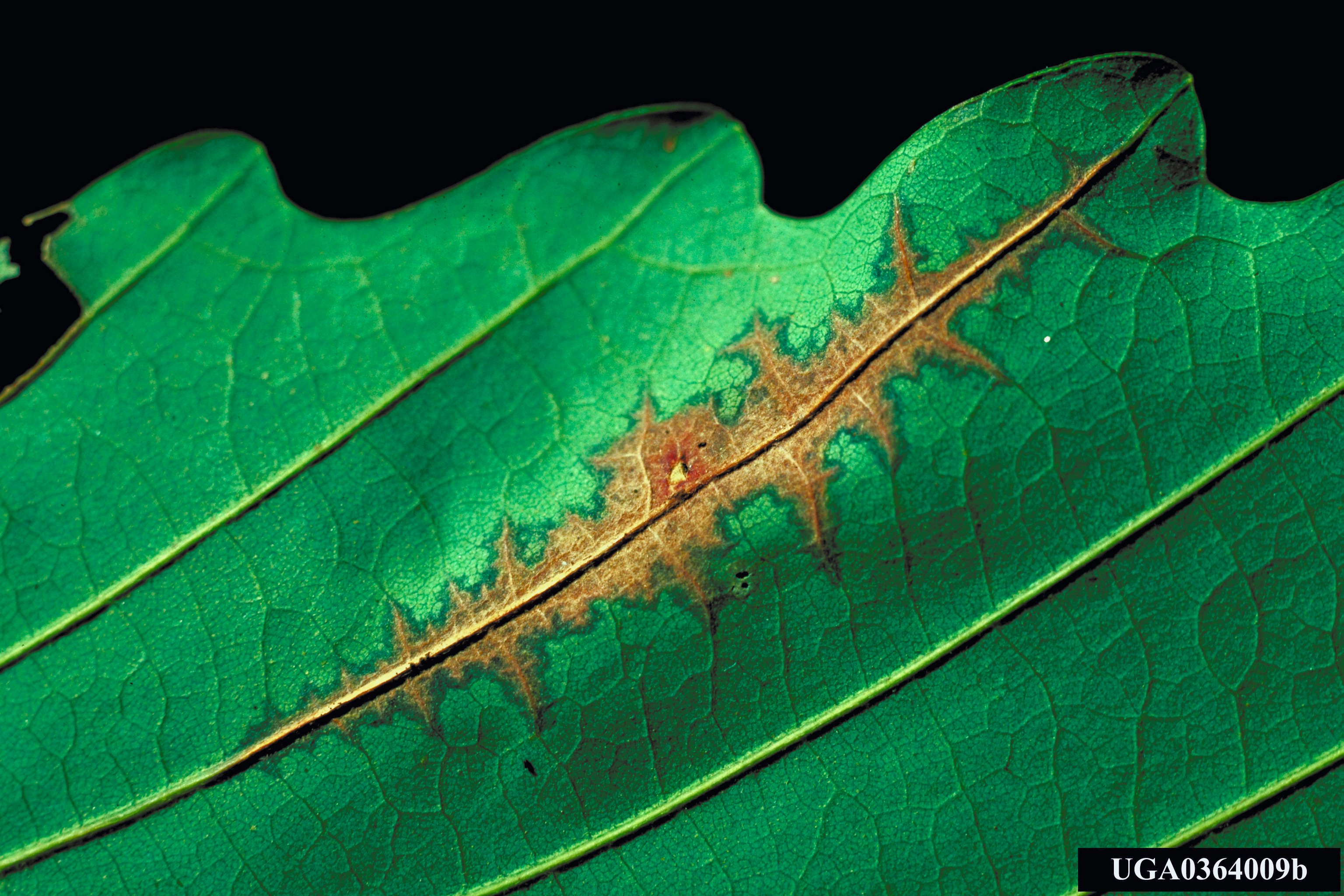
- leaf symptoms of Apiognomonia errabunda

Scientific classification
- Kingdom: Fungi
- Division: Ascomycota
- Class: Sordariomycetes
- Order: Diaporthales
- Family: Valsaceae; Tul. & C.Tul., 1861

Type genus
- Valsa Fr.

= Valsaceae =

Family of fungi

Valsaceae is a family of sac fungi in the Diaporthales order.

== Genera ==
- Amphiporthe
- Apioplagiostoma
- Apioporthella
- Chadefaudiomyces
- Cryptascoma
- Cytospora
- Diaporthella
- Ditopellina
- Durispora
- Hypospilina
- Kapooria
- Leptosillia
- Leucostoma
- Maculatipalma
- Paravalsa
- Phomopsis
- Phruensis
- Rossmania
- Torsellia Fr. 1849
- Valsa
- Valsella
