= List of elm diseases =

This article is a list of diseases of elms (Ulmus spp.).

== Bacterial diseases ==
Bacterial diseases
Bacterial wetwood/slime flux	Enterobacter nimipressuralis = Erwinia nimipressuralis Bacillus megaterium Pseudomonas fluorescens
Discoloration (xylem)	Bacteria
Elm leaf scorch	Xylella fastidiosa

== Fungal diseases ==
Fungal diseases
Anthracnose	Asteroma inconspicuum = Gloeosporium inconspicuum Gloeosporium ulmicola
Armillaria root rot Shoestring root rot	Armillaria mellea Rhizomorpha subcorticalis [anamorph]
Blackspot	Asteroma ulmeum = Gloeosporium ulmeum Stegophora ulmea [teleomorph] = Gnomonia ulmea
Botryodiplodia canker	Sphaeropsis ulmicola = Botryodiplodia hydrodermia
Botryosphaeria canker	Botryosphaeria dothidea Fusicoccum aesculi [anamorph]
British tar spot	Dothidella ulmi
Chalara root rot	Chalara thielavioides
Coniothyrium canker	Coniothyrium spp. Coniothyrium celtidis-australis Leptosphaeria coniothyrium Diapleella coniothyrium [anamorph]
Cytospora canker	Cytospora chrysosperma Valsa sordida [anamorph] Cytospora leucosperma = Cytospora ambiens Valsa ambiens [anamorph] Cytospora nivea Leucostoma nivea [anamorph]
Cytosporina canker	Cytosporina ludibunda
Damping-off, Fusarium	Fusarium spp.
Damping-off, Pythium	Pythium ultimum
Damping-off, Rhizoctonia	Rhizoctonia solani Thanatephorus cucumeris [teleomorph]
Decay (xylem)	Trametes versicolor = Coriolus versicolor Flammulina velutipes Ganoderma applanatum = Fomes applanatus Phellinus spp. = Fomes spp. Pleurotus spp. Polyporus squamosus Other basidiomycetes
Discoloration (xylem)	Deuteromycetes
Dothiorella canker and wilt	Dothiorella ulmi
Dutch elm disease	Ophiostoma ulmi = Ceratocystis ulmi Pesotum ulmi [anamorph] = Graphium ulmi Ophiostoma novo-ulmi
Leaf blister	Taphrina ulmi
Mistletoe (infection)	Phoradendron serotinum = Phoradendron flavescens Phoradendron tomentosum Viscum album
Nectria canker	Nectria spp. Nectria cinnabarina Tubercularia vulgaris [anamorph] Nectria coccinea Cylindrocarpon candidum [anamorph] Nectria ditissima Cylindrocarpon willkommii [anamorph] Nectria galligena Cylindrocarpon heteronemum [anamorph]
Phoma canker	Phoma glomerata = Phoma conidiogena
Phomopsis canker	Phomopsis oblonga Diaporthe eres [teleomorph]
Phymatotrichum root rot (cotton root rot/Texas Root Rot)	Phymatotrichopsis omnivora = Phymatotrichum omnivorum
Phytophthora canker (pit canker)	Phytophthora inflata
Phytophthora root rot	Phytophthora megasperma
Powdery mildew	Phyllactinia nivea Phyllactinia ulmi Erysiphe ulmi Erysiphe macrospora Erysiphe kenjiana Erysiphe neglecta Erysiphe parvifoliae Erysiphe ulmi-alatae
Schizoxylon canker	Schizoxylon microsporum
Sooty mold	Perisporiaceae (Ascomycetes): numerous dark-spored fungi imperfecti
Thyrostroma canker	Stigmina compacta = Thyrostroma compactum
Tubercularia canker	Tubercularia ulmea
Verticillium wilt	Verticillium albo-atrum Verticillium dahlia
Violet root rot	Helicobasidium brebissonii Rhizoctonia crocorum [anamorph]

== Miscellaneous diseases and disorders ==
Miscellaneous diseases and disorders
Discoloration (xylem)	Actinomycetes

== Nematodes, parasitic ==
Nematodes, parasitic
Lance	Hoploliamus spp.
Ring	Criconemella spp.
Root-knot	Meloidoglyne spp.
Spiral	Helicotylenchus spp.
Stunt	Tylenchorhynchus spp.

== Virus and Phytoplasma diseases ==
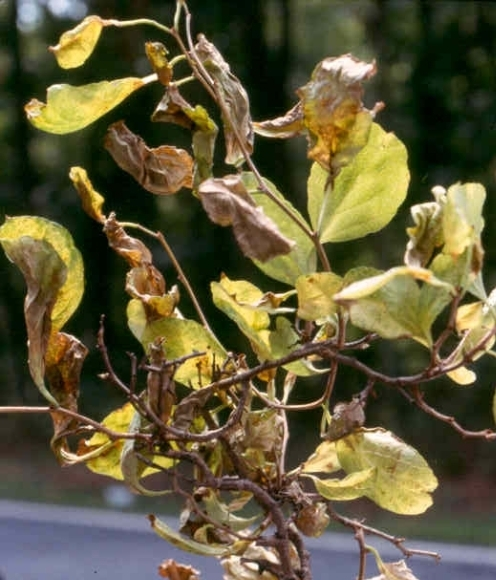
Elm phloem necrosis

Virus and mycoplasmalike organism [MLO] diseases
Elm mosaic	'Elm mosaic virus'
Elm mottle	Elm mottle virus
Elm stripe	Viruslike agent
Elm witches' broom	Phytoplasma (graft-transmissible)
Elm yellows (phloem necrosis)	Phytoplasma (graft-transmissible)
Zonate canker	'Elm zonate canker virus' (graft-transmissible)
