= List of Aposphaeria species =

This list of Aposphaeria species has been taken directly from MycoBank and currently contains a number of orthographic variants. Not all of these are accepted names: they are names that have been used.

1. Aposphaeria abietis
2. Aposphaeria acuta
3. Aposphaeria agminalis
4. Aposphaeria allantella
5. Aposphaeria alpigena
6. Aposphaeria alpiniae
7. Aposphaeria amaranthi
8. Aposphaeria amaranti
9. Aposphaeria amelanchieris
10. Aposphaeria anomala
11. Aposphaeria arachidis
12. Aposphaeria aranea
13. Aposphaeria arctica
14. Aposphaeria artemisiae
15. Aposphaeria bambusae
16. Aposphaeria bergii
17. Aposphaeria berlesii
18. Aposphaeria bicuspidata
19. Aposphaeria bombacis
20. Aposphaeria boudieri
21. Aposphaeria brassicae
22. Aposphaeria broomeana
23. Aposphaeria broomeiana
24. Aposphaeria brunaudiana
25. Aposphaeria brunneotincta
26. Aposphaeria buddleiae
27. Aposphaeria buddlejae
28. Aposphaeria calathiscus
29. Aposphaeria calligoni
30. Aposphaeria canavaliae
31. Aposphaeria canavalliae
32. Aposphaeria caraganae
33. Aposphaeria caricae
34. Aposphaeria caricicola
35. Aposphaeria caulina
36. Aposphaeria cava
37. Aposphaeria cercidis
38. Aposphaeria charticola
39. Aposphaeria cinerea
40. Aposphaeria citricola
41. Aposphaeria citrispora
42. Aposphaeria cladoniae
43. Aposphaeria clematidea
44. Aposphaeria clypeata
45. Aposphaeria collabascens
46. Aposphaeria collabens
47. Aposphaeria complanata
48. Aposphaeria compressa
49. Aposphaeria condensata
50. Aposphaeria conica
51. Aposphaeria coniosporioides
52. Aposphaeria consors
53. Aposphaeria corallinolutea
54. Aposphaeria cruenta
55. Aposphaeria dendrophomoides
56. Aposphaeria densiuscula
57. Aposphaeria denudata
58. Aposphaeria desertorum
59. Aposphaeria difformis
60. Aposphaeria elevata
61. Aposphaeria elymi
62. Aposphaeria ephedrae
63. Aposphaeria epicorticalis
64. Aposphaeria epileuca
65. Aposphaeria eragrostidis
66. Aposphaeria eurotiae
67. Aposphaeria ferrum-equinum
68. Aposphaeria fibricola
69. Aposphaeria fibriseda
70. Aposphaeria fibrisequa
71. Aposphaeria fraxini
72. Aposphaeria freticola
73. Aposphaeria fugax
74. Aposphaeria fuscidula
75. Aposphaeria fuscomaculans
76. Aposphaeria gallicola
77. Aposphaeria glaziovii
78. Aposphaeria glomerata
79. Aposphaeria gregaria
80. Aposphaeria halimodendri
81. Aposphaeria haloxyli
82. Aposphaeria hapalophragmii
83. Aposphaeria hemisphaerica
84. Aposphaeria henryana
85. Aposphaeria herbicola
86. Aposphaeria heveae
87. Aposphaeria hippuridis
88. Aposphaeria hospitae
89. Aposphaeria humicola
90. Aposphaeria hysterella
91. Aposphaeria ilicis
92. Aposphaeria iliensis
93. Aposphaeria inconspicua
94. Aposphaeria inophila
95. Aposphaeria jubaeae
96. Aposphaeria kansensis
97. Aposphaeria kiefferiana
98. Aposphaeria kravtzevii
99. Aposphaeria labens
100. Aposphaeria lampsanae
101. Aposphaeria lapsanae
102. Aposphaeria lentisci
103. Aposphaeria leptospermi
104. Aposphaeria leptosphaerioides
105. Aposphaeria librincola
106. Aposphaeria lignicola
107. Aposphaeria longipes
108. Aposphaeria macrosperma
109. Aposphaeria major
110. Aposphaeria majuscula
111. Aposphaeria martinii
112. Aposphaeria mediella
113. Aposphaeria melaleuca
114. Aposphaeria melaleucae
115. Aposphaeria mesembryanthemi
116. Aposphaeria minuta
117. Aposphaeria minutula
118. Aposphaeria mojunkumica
119. Aposphaeria mollis
120. Aposphaeria montbretiae
121. Aposphaeria mori
122. Aposphaeria mucifera
123. Aposphaeria multiformis
124. Aposphaeria musarum
125. Aposphaeria nigra
126. Aposphaeria nitens
127. Aposphaeria nitidiuscula
128. Aposphaeria nucicola
129. Aposphaeria ohiensis
130. Aposphaeria oxalidis
131. Aposphaeria oxybaphi
132. Aposphaeria oxystoma
133. Aposphaeria pakistanica
134. Aposphaeria papillula
135. Aposphaeria parasitica
136. Aposphaeria peregrina
137. Aposphaeria petersii
138. Aposphaeria pezizoides
139. Aposphaeria phellodendri
140. Aposphaeria pinea
141. Aposphaeria pini-densiflorae
142. Aposphaeria piperis
143. Aposphaeria polonica
144. Aposphaeria pomi
145. Aposphaeria populea
146. Aposphaeria populina
147. Aposphaeria prillieuxiana
148. Aposphaeria protea
149. Aposphaeria pulchella
150. Aposphaeria pulicaris
151. Aposphaeria pulviscula
152. Aposphaeria punicina
153. Aposphaeria purpurascens
154. Aposphaeria putamina
155. Aposphaeria putaminum
156. Aposphaeria quercina
157. Aposphaeria radicata
158. Aposphaeria ramalinae
159. Aposphaeria reaumuriae
160. Aposphaeria rhododendri
161. Aposphaeria rhois
162. Aposphaeria rostrata
163. Aposphaeria rubefaciens
164. Aposphaeria rudis
165. Aposphaeria rugulosa
166. Aposphaeria salicis
167. Aposphaeria salicum
168. Aposphaeria santolinae
169. Aposphaeria schizothecioides
170. Aposphaeria sepulta
171. Aposphaeria sequoiae
172. Aposphaeria seriata
173. Aposphaeria silenes
174. Aposphaeria sphaerospora
175. Aposphaeria stenospora
176. Aposphaeria stenostoma
177. Aposphaeria stigmospora
178. Aposphaeria striolata
179. Aposphaeria subcorticalis
180. Aposphaeria subcrustacea
181. Aposphaeria suberina
182. Aposphaeria subtilis
183. Aposphaeria taquarae
184. Aposphaeria tiliana
185. Aposphaeria tragopogi
186. Aposphaeria tragopogonis
187. Aposphaeria trivialis
188. Aposphaeria turmalis
189. Aposphaeria ulei
190. Aposphaeria ulmi
191. Aposphaeria ulmicola
192. Aposphaeria umbonata
193. Aposphaeria villaresiae
194. Aposphaeria violacea
195. Aposphaeria zeae
