= Tunstallia =

Tunstallia may refer to:

- Tunstallia (fungus), a genus in the family Sydowiellaceae.
- Tunstallia (gastropod), an extinct species of Lophospiridae.
