= V. nivea =

V. nivea may refer to:

- Valsa nivea, a plant pathogen species
- Veronica nivea, the milfoil speedwell or snow speedwell, a flowering plant species

== See also ==
- Nivea (disambiguation)
