= Tunstallia aculeata =

Scientific classification
- Kingdom: Fungi
- Division: Ascomycota
- Class: Sordariomycetes
- Order: Diaporthales
- Family: Sydowiellaceae
- Genus: Tunstallia
- Species: T. aculeata

Binomial name
- Tunstallia aculeata (Petch) Agnihothr. (1961)

Synonyms
- Aglaospora aculeata Petch; Phragmodiaporthe aculeata (Petch) Wehm. (1941); Rossmania aculeata (Petch) Lar.N. Vassiljeva (2001)

Species of fungus

Tunstallia aculeata is an ascomycete fungus that is a plant pathogen infecting tea.
