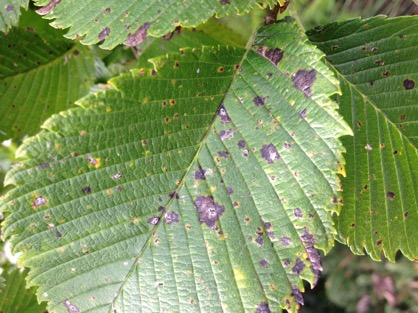
- Symptoms of black spot on elm in the summer
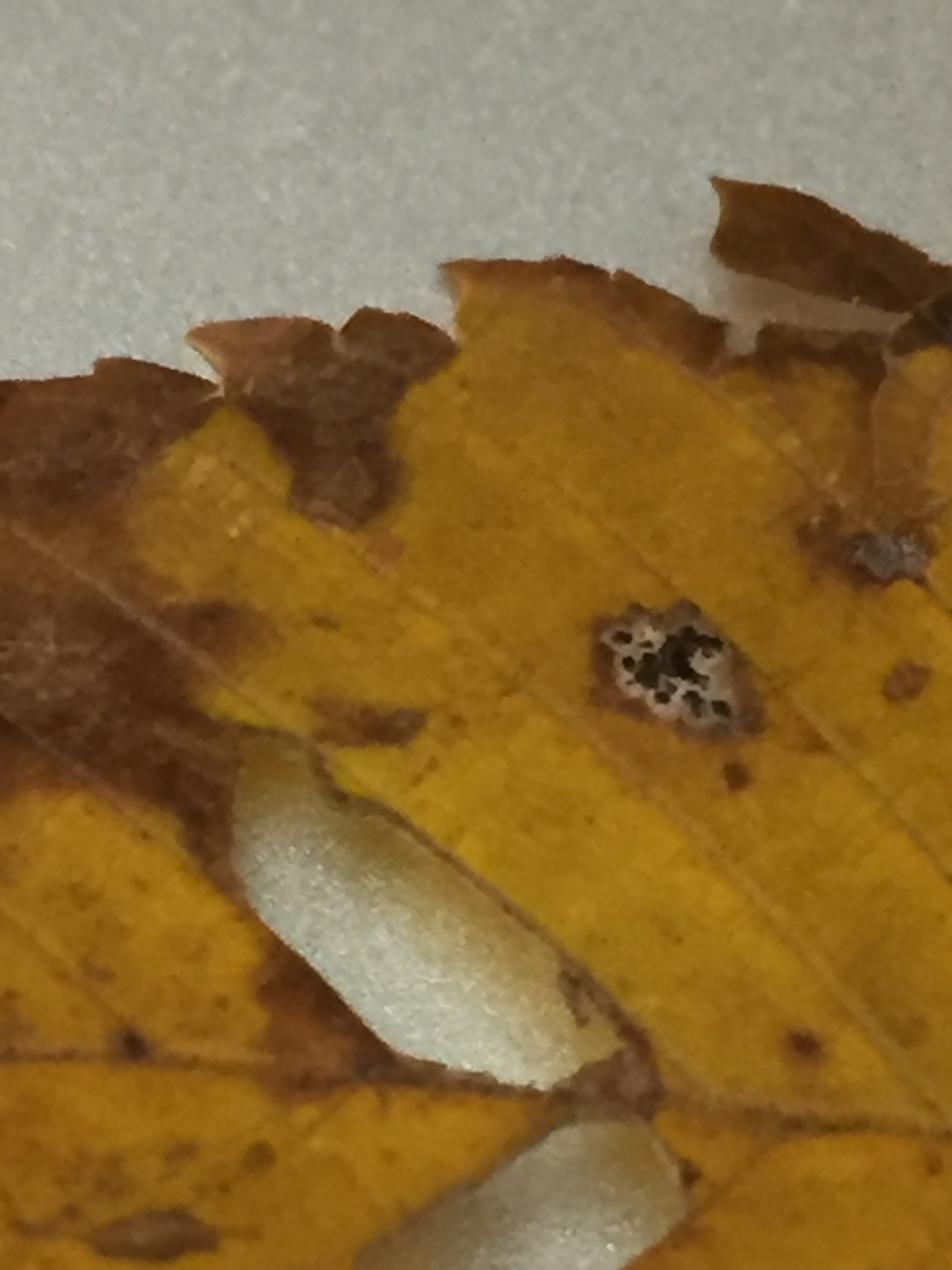
- Symptoms of black spot on an elm leaf in the fall

Scientific classification
- Domain: Eukaryota
- Kingdom: Fungi
- Division: Ascomycota
- Class: Sordariomycetes
- Order: Diaporthales
- Family: Sydowiellaceae
- Genus: Stegophora
- Species: S. ulmea

Binomial name
- Stegophora ulmea (Fr.) Syd. & P. Syd., (1916)

Synonyms
- Asteroma ulmeum (Miles) B. Sutton, (1980); Cylindrosporella ulmea (Miles) Arx, (1957); Dothidella ulmi (Fr.) Ellis & Everh., (1892); Gloeosporium ulmeum Miles, (1921); Gloeosporium ulmicola Miles [as 'ulmicolum'], (1921); Gnomonia ulmea (Fr.) Thüm., (1878); Lambro ulmea (Fr.) E. Müll., (1962); Sphaeria ulmea Fr., (1823); Xyloma ulmeum Schwein., (1822)

= Stegophora ulmea =

Species of fungus

Stegophora ulmea is a foliar disease of elms commonly known as black spot of elm, twig blight, and elm leaf scab. It is characterized by yellow spots that become black spots on the leaves. The pathogen is an ascomycete fungus native to North America. Stegophora ulmea is its teleomorph name. It has two anamorph names, Gloeosporium ulmicolom referring to the macroconidia stage and Cylindrosporella ulmea referring to the microconidia stage. This pathogen was formerly known as Gnomonia ulmea.

== Hosts and symptoms ==
Stegophora ulmea infects all Ulmus species and Japanese zelkova. It is most virulent on American white elm, Ulmus Americana. Other elms it is known to infect include:

- Ulmus alata (winged elm)
- Ulmus carpinifolia (European field elm)
- Ulmus crassifolia (cedar elm)
- Ulmus glabra (Wych elm)
- Ulmus hollandica (Dutch elm)
- Ulmus japonica (Japanese elm)
- Ulmus laciniata
- Ulmus laevis (European white elm)
- Ulmus parvifolia (Chinese elm)
- Ulmus procera (English elm)
- Ulmus pumila (Siberian elm)
- Ulmus serotina
- Ulmus thomasii (rock elm)
- Ulmus rubra (slippery elm)
- Zelkova serrata

Stegophora ulmea is characterized by chlorotic yellow spots 1 millimeter in diameter with a black center that develop early in the spring. They darken and become raised. The black center can increase to occupy the entire chlorotic area. The black spots can become about 5 millimeters in diameter. As the season continues, the tissue around the original spot may become necrotic. In severe cases of the disease there is premature shedding of leaves, blight of young leaves and shoots, and complete defoliation early in the fall. Fruits that are infected become crumpled. Infection of mature trees is rarely fatal.

== Disease cycle ==
In the spring, new leaves are infected with ascospores which develop from the survival structure, perithecia, found in leaf debris. It is thought that inoculum from overwintered buds can also result in infection. The perithecia are the structure in which S. ulmea survives the winter. Ascospore release is synchronized with the foliar development of the elms. Ascospores commonly infect lower leaves and leaves near the bud. A period of wetness and dryness with a temperature over 7 degrees Celsius is required before ascospores are released. The ascospores disperse through the air and have the potential to travel over long distances. Acervuli develop in the center of the lesions. Acervuli can release macroconidia, which are white. They mature 10–20 days after infection. During spring and early summer, the macroconidia act as a secondary inoculum. This is the asexual part of S. ulmea’s life cycle. Water is necessary for the dispersal of the macroconidia. Microconidia are produced in the lesions during midsummer. They act as spermatia in the sexual stage of the S. ulmea’s life cycle. During late summer and fall perithecia, the sexual structure, begins to develop.

== Control ==
Sanitation, or removal all leaf debris seems to be the best method of control. In commercial growing arenas, it is suggested that overhead watering should not be used, because it helps spread the pathogen. Resistance greatly varies between species. U. thomasfi seems to be the most resistant. The majority of elms seem to be tolerant. A dominant gene conferring resistance to U. parvifolia was discovered, though it did not provide absolute resistance. There is currently no information about fungicides used to control this disease. This disease is not typically fatal and is not actively addressed. Aeration seems to moderately reduce growth and sporulation. Cool temperatures and high humidity enhance the disease, so avoidance of these conditions will decrease the prevalence of disease.
