= Lambro (fungus) =

Scientific classification
- Kingdom: Fungi
- Division: Ascomycota
- Class: Sordariomycetes
- Order: Diaporthales
- Family: Sydowiellaceae
- Genus: Lambro; Racib.

Type species
- Lambro insignis Racib.

Species
- L.insignis; L. symploci G.C.Zhao & R.L.Zhao

Genus of fungi

Lambro is a genus of fungi in the family Sydowiellaceae.

== Species ==
As accepted by Species Fungorum;

- Lambro insignis Racib. (1900)
- Lambro symploci G.C. Zhao & R.L. Zhao (2012)

Former species;

- L. oharana (Y. Nisik. & H. Matsumoto) E. Müll. (1962) = Hypospilina oharana, Valsaceae
- L. stellata (Henn.) E. Müll. (1962) = Metadothella stellata, Hypocreales Order
- L. ulmea (Fr.) E. Müll. (1962) = Stegophora ulmea, Sydowiellaceae
