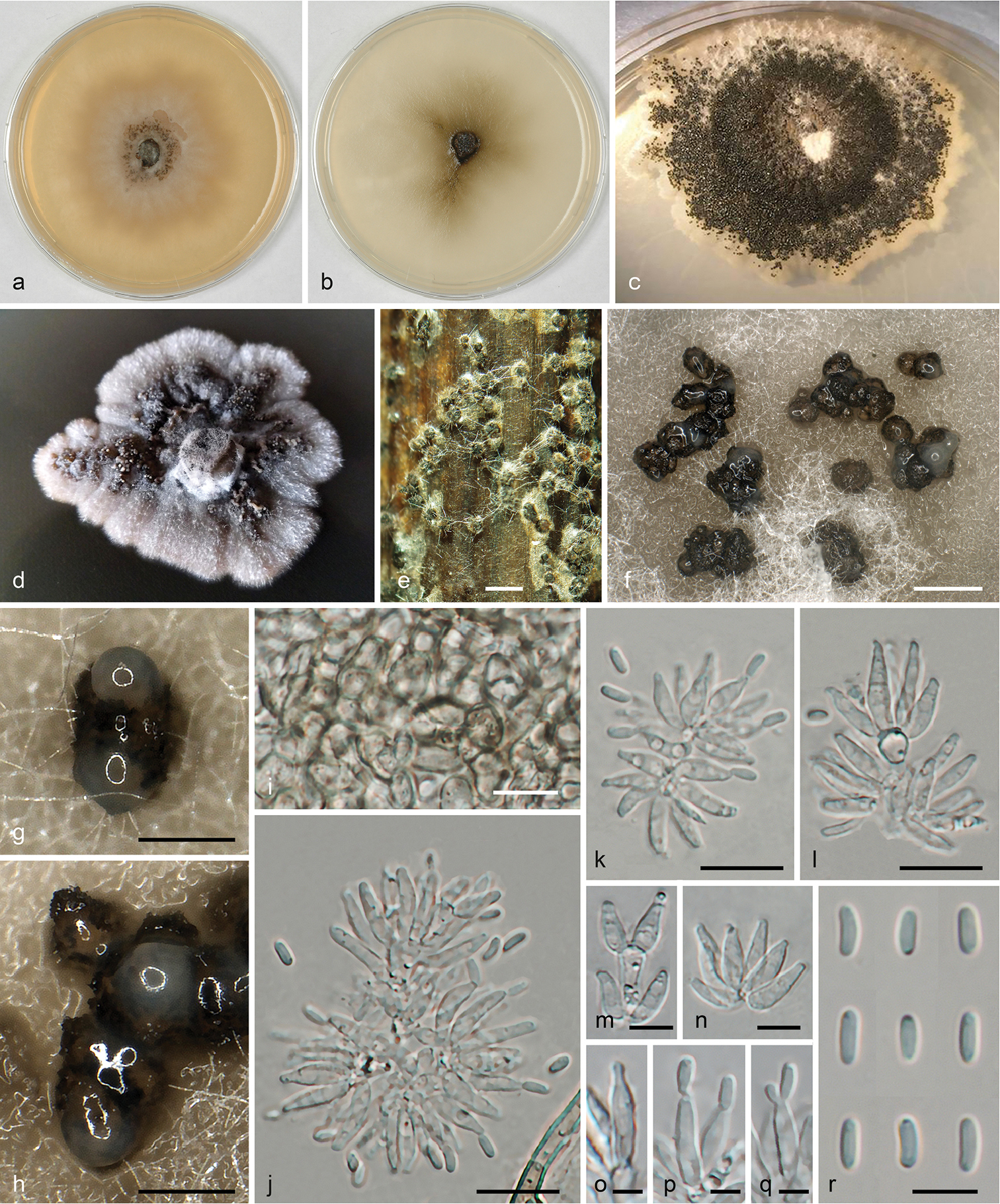
- Liberomyces pistaciae

Scientific classification
- Kingdom: Fungi
- Division: Ascomycota
- Class: Sordariomycetes
- Order: Xylariales
- Family: Leptosilliaceae; Voglmayr & Jaklitsch (2019)
- Genus: Leptosillia; Höhn. (1928)

Type species
- Leptosillia notha Höhn. (1928)

Synonyms
- Cresporhaphis M.B.Aguirre (1991)

= Leptosillia =

Genus of fungi

Leptosillia is a fungal genus in the monogeneric family Leptosilliaceae. The genus was established in 1928 by the Austrian mycologist Franz Xaver Rudolf von Höhnel and was originally thought to contain only one species for many decades. The bark-dwelling fungi of Leptosillia primarily live as harmless residents inside tree tissues, occasionally forming partnerships with microscopic algae, though one species can cause disease in pistachio trees. They produce tiny black, flask-shaped fruiting bodies on tree bark and are found mainly in temperate regions of Europe, though related species probably occur worldwide.

== Taxonomy ==
The genus was circumscribed by Austrian mycologist Franz Xaver Rudolf von Höhnel in 1928. As the genus name suggests, Leptosillia was considered to be closely related to the diaporthalean genus Sillia (in the Stilbosporaceae family, Diaporthales order).

The genus was monotypic for a long time, containing only the type species, Leptosillia notha. Until molecular phylogenetics analysis published in 2019 showed that the genus belongs to the order Xylariales, and that the genus Cresporhaphis should be included in Leptosillia. These analyses placed Leptosillia as a sister taxon to family Delonicicolaceae, and so a new family, Leptosilliaceae, was circumscribed to contain it.

== Description ==
Leptosillia is now regarded as a small clade of bark-dwelling fungi comprising seven species that are primarily saprotrophic, although some collections engage in a facultative lichen partnership with microscopic algae. Superficially it resembles the lichen genus Leptorhaphis, but it differs in having thin-walled, non-fissitunicate asci. When a lichen thallus occurs it remains immersed in the bark and appears only as a faint grey-whitish film; in many specimens no photobiont is present and the fungus fruits independently. Where algae do occur they are either unicellular chlorococcoid cells or filamentous Trentepohlia-type filaments, reflecting the genus's flexible, non-obligate approach to lichenisation.

The reproductive structures are perithecia—minute, black, flask-shaped cavities that sit partly on the surface of the bark and partly inside it. Perithecia may occur singly, in loose groups, or merge into larger clusters; when they dry, their walls sometimes collapse sideways, giving a slightly distorted outline. Each perithecium bears a small, nipple-like opening (ostiolar papilla) through which spores escape; this opening is lined by fine, sterile filaments (periphyses) and may show shallow furrows. Inside, transparent paraphyses—slender, septate threads—are embedded in a jelly-like matrix and weave between the spore-bearing asci. The asci arise successively from the base, are club- to tube-shaped, thin-walled, and do not stain blue in iodine, indicating the absence of the usual amyloid structures. Each ascus contains eight ascospores arranged in two to three overlapping rows or in tight bundles. The spores are colourless (hyaline), thin-walled and characteristically curved, ranging from crescent-shaped to delicate S-forms; some remain single-celled, while others develop one or more internal cross-walls yet do not constrict at these septa. The asci are typically 78–110 μm × 8–11 μm, and the ascospore are usually 5–11-septate and 22–65 μm long)

Asexual reproduction occurs in similar dark pycnidia—shperical to pear-shaped chambers that may be single-celled or subdivided. Short conidiophores lining the inner wall give rise to cylindrical or flask-shaped cells that repeatedly bud off new tips (percurrent or sympodial growth). These cells produce slender, hyaline conidia that vary from sausage-shaped to thread-like. No characteristic secondary metabolites have been detected in the genus.

== Habitat and distribution ==
Leptosillia species fruit almost exclusively on the bark of living woody plants. Field collections and culture work show the perithecia developing in bark crevices, cork wings or loose bark scales on trunks and branches of hosts such as field maple (Acer campestre), sycamore (A. pseudoplatanus), sessile and pedunculate oaks (Quercus spp.), elm (Ulmus minor) and several other broad-leaved trees. Sampling for the 2019 revision recovered ascomata or viable isolates from phloem and sapwood of apparently healthy trees, confirming that the fungus can persist endophytically before emerging at the surface. A few taxa have narrower preferences: L. fusariospora remains confined to the corky outgrowths of A. campestre, whereas L. macrospora is routine on young roadside oaks. The only known deviation from a benign bark-dwelling lifestyle is L. pistaciae, a canker pathogen that invades the vascular tissues of cultivated pistachio (Pistacia vera).

Most confirmed collections come from temperate Europe, with records spanning Austria, Croatia, the Czech Republic, Germany, Hungary, Poland, Sweden and Switzerland. However, sequence-only isolates embedded in Leptosillia have been recovered as endophytes from woody hosts in Asia, Oceania, North and South America, indicating a much broader—probably pan-tropical to temperate—distribution that is still being mapped.

== Ecology ==
Ecologically, the genus is now interpreted as non-lichenised endophytes or saprotrophs that occasionally become opportunistic pathogens. Earlier reports of a lichen thallus proved inconsistent: detailed microscopy of fresh and historical material failed to confirm a stable algal partnership, and all species germinate readily in axenic culture. The same study argued that the ease with which Leptosillia colonises symptomless bark and vascular tissues, together with the multitude of environmental DNA sequences from endophyte surveys, points to the family Leptosilliaceae being an important but still under-recognised component of global woody-plant microbiomes.

== Species ==
As of June 2025, Species Fungorum (in the Catalogue of Life) accept 12 species of Leptosillia:

- Leptosillia acerina (Rehm) Voglmayr & Jaklitsch (2019)
- Leptosillia cordylines Senan. & K.D.Hyde (2020) – China
- Leptosillia fusariospora (Ellis & Everh.) Voglmayr & Jaklitsch (2019)
- Leptosillia macrospora (Eitner) Voglmayr & Jaklitsch (2019)
- Leptosillia mayteni Crous (2019)
- Leptosillia mimosae A.V.Silva, L.C.Maia & J.D.P.Bezerra (2021) – Brazil
- Leptosillia muelleri (Duby) Voglmayr & Jaklitsch (2019)
- Leptosillia notha Höhn. (1928)
- Leptosillia pinicola (Samp.) Voglmayr & Jaklitsch (2019)
- Leptosillia pistaciae (Voglmayr, S.Vitale, D.Aiello, Guarnaccia, Luongo & Belisario) Voglmayr (2019)
- Leptosillia slaptonensis (P.F.Cannon) Voglmayr, M.B.Aguirre & Jaklitsch (2019)
- Leptosillia wienkampii (J.Lahm ex Hazsl.) Voglmayr & Jaklitsch (2019)
