= Tetrahydroxynaphthalene reductase =

tetrahydroxynaphthalene reductase

Identifiers
- EC no.: 1.1.1.252
- CAS no.: 153702-05-7

Databases
- IntEnz: IntEnz view
- BRENDA: BRENDA entry
- ExPASy: NiceZyme view
- KEGG: KEGG entry
- MetaCyc: metabolic pathway
- PRIAM: profile
- PDB structures: RCSB PDB PDBe PDBsum
- Gene Ontology: AmiGO / QuickGO
Search
- PMC: articles
- PubMed: articles
- NCBI: proteins

In enzymology, tetrahydroxynaphthalene reductase (EC 1.1.1.252) is an enzyme that catalyzes the chemical reaction

scytalone
+ NADP^{+}
H^{+}
H^{+}
naphthalene-1,3,6,8-tetrol
+ NADPH

The two substrates of this enzyme are scytalone and oxidised nicotinamide adenine dinucleotide phosphate (NADP^{+}). Its products are naphthalene-1,3,6,8-tetrol, reduced NADPH, and a proton.

This enzyme belongs to the family of oxidoreductases, specifically those acting on the CH-OH group of donor with NAD^{+} or NADP^{+} as acceptor. The systematic name of this enzyme class is scytalone:NADP^{+} Delta5-oxidoreductase.

== Structural studies ==
As of late 2007, 3 structures have been solved for this class of enzymes, with PDB accession codes 1DOH, 1G0N, and 1G0O.
