= Scytalone =

Chemical compound

Names
- IUPAC name (3R)-3,6,8-trihydroxy-3,4-dihydro-2H-naphthalen-1-one
- Other names: 3,4-Dihydro-3,6,8-trihydroxy-1(2H)naphthalenone; SCYTALON; Scytolone

Identifiers
| CAS Number | 49598-85-8 |
| 3D model (JSmol) | Interactive image |
| ChEBI | CHEBI:16945 |
| ChEMBL | ChEMBL4081370 |
| ChemSpider | 142729 |
| KEGG | C00779 |
| MeSH | scytalone |
| PubChem CID | 162567 |
| UNII | 1MQ5L1414D |
| CompTox Dashboard (EPA) | DTXSID50964289 |
- InChI: InChI=1S/C10H10O4/c11-6-1-5-2-7(12)4-9(14)10(5)8(13)3-6/h1,3,7,11-13H,2,4H2/t7-/m1/s1 Key: RTWVXIIKUFSDJB-SSDOTTSWSA-N
- SMILES: C1[C@H](CC(=O)C2=C1C=C(C=C2O)O)O

Properties
| Chemical formula | C_{10}H_{10}O_{4} |
| Molar mass | 194.18 g/mol |
| log P | 0.9 |
- Except where otherwise noted, data are given for materials in their standard state (at 25 °C [77 °F], 100 kPa). Infobox references

Scytalone or Scytolone is a cyclic beta hydroxy ketone substituted by hydroxy groups at positions 3, 6, and 8. It is a natural product found in various fungal species including Cytospora populina and Ceratocystis fimbriata.

== Properties ==
Scytalone is a chemical compound with a cyclic structure consisting of a benzene ring fused to a cyclohexenone ring. It is a simple derivative of 1-tetralone with hydroxy groups at 3, 6 and 8th positions. It contains one stereocenter and therefore exists in R- and S- forms.

== Biological significance ==
Scytalone is a natural product found in species of fungal genus Scytalidium. It is also found in many other fungal species like Phialocephala lagerbergii, Cytospora populina, Verticillium dahliae, Phialophora lagerbergii and Pestalotiopsis fici.

It is a pivotal intermediate in the biosynthesis of melanin in fungi, the pigment responsible for fungal coloration. Melanin production in fungi is crucial for several biological processes like protection against UV radiation, defense against pathogens, regulation of cell wall integrity and protection against other physical and chemical stresses.

== See also ==
- Scytalone dehydratase
