= Stegophora =

Scientific classification
- Kingdom: Fungi
- Division: Ascomycota
- Class: Sordariomycetes
- Order: Diaporthales
- Family: Sydowiellaceae
- Genus: Stegophora; Syd. & P. Syd.

Type species
- Stegophora ulmea (Fr.) Syd. & P. Syd.

Species
- S. aemula S. mali S. oharana S. ulmea

Genus of fungi

Stegophora is a genus of fungi in the family Sydowiellaceae.
