= Uleoporthe =

Scientific classification
- Kingdom: Fungi
- Division: Ascomycota
- Class: Sordariomycetes
- Order: Diaporthales
- Family: Sydowiellaceae
- Genus: Uleoporthe; Petr.

Type species
- Uleoporthe orbiculata (Syd. & P. Syd.) Petr.

Genus of fungi

Uleoporthe is a genus of fungi in the family Sydowiellaceae. This is a monotypic genus, containing the single species Uleoporthe orbiculata.
