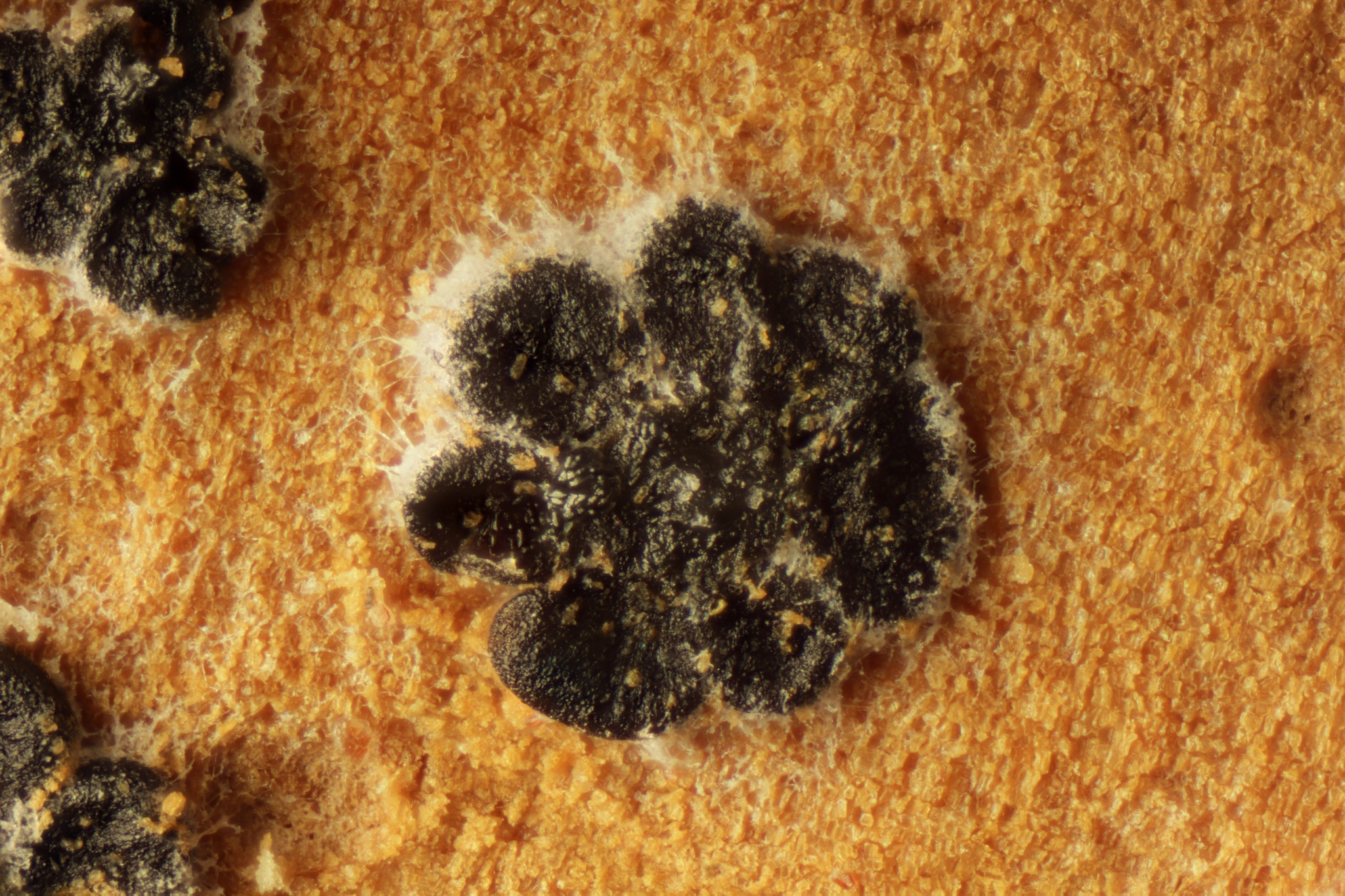
- Hapalocystis kickxii

Scientific classification
- Kingdom: Fungi
- Division: Ascomycota
- Class: Sordariomycetes
- Order: Diaporthales
- Family: Sydowiellaceae
- Genus: Hapalocystis; Auersw. ex Fuckel (1863)

Type species
- Hapalocystis berkeleyi Auersw. ex Fuckel (1863)

= Hapalocystis =

Genus of fungi

Hapalocystis is a genus of fungi in the family Sydowiellaceae.

== Species ==
As accepted by Species Fungorum;

- Hapalocystis berkeleyi Auersw. ex Fuckel (1863)
- Hapalocystis bicaudata Fuckel (1864)
- Hapalocystis corni (Wehm.) M.E. Barr (1979)
- Hapalocystis kickxii (Westend.) Voglmayr (2017)
- Hapalocystis occidentalis Jaklitsch & Voglmayr (2004)
- Hapalocystis ulmi (Wehm.) M.E. Barr (1978)
- Hapalocystis vexans Speg. (1925)

Former species;

- H. berkeleyi var. kickxii (Westend.) M.E. Barr (1978) = Hapalocystis kickxii, Sydowiellaceae
- H. mirabilis Sorokīn (1874) = Sorokinocystis mirabilis, Chytridiales order
