= Caudospora =

Scientific classification
- Kingdom: Fungi
- Division: Ascomycota
- Class: Sordariomycetes
- Order: Diaporthales
- Family: Sydowiellaceae
- Genus: Caudospora; Starb.

Genus of fungi

Caudospora is a genus of fungi within the Diaporthales order, class Sordariomycetes. It was later placed in the Sydowiellaceae family.

== Species ==
As accepted by Species Fungorum;

- Caudospora iranica Mehrabi & Voglmayr (2018)
- Caudospora taleola (Fr.) Starbäck (1889)
