= Ulmus crassifolia 'Brazos Rim' =

Elm cultivar

- Species: Ulmus crassifolia
- Cultivar: 'Brazos Rim'
- Origin: Sunshine Nursery, Oklahoma, US

The cedar elm cultivar Ulmus crassifolia 'Brazos Rim' was cloned from a tree growing at the Sunshine Nursery, Clinton, Oklahoma.

== Description ==
Not available.

== Pests and diseases ==
No information available.

== Etymology ==
The cultivar is named for the Brazos Rim native tree nursery near Fort Worth, Texas.
