= Scytalone dehydratase =

scytalone dehydratase

Identifiers
- EC no.: 4.2.1.94

Databases
- IntEnz: IntEnz view
- BRENDA: BRENDA entry
- ExPASy: NiceZyme view
- KEGG: KEGG entry
- MetaCyc: metabolic pathway
- PRIAM: profile
- PDB structures: RCSB PDB PDBe PDBsum
- Gene Ontology: AmiGO / QuickGO
Search
- PMC: articles
- PubMed: articles
- NCBI: proteins

The enzyme scytalone dehydratase (EC 4.2.1.94) catalyzes the chemical reaction

scytalone $\rightleftharpoons$ 1,3,8-trihydroxynaphthalene + H_{2}O

This enzyme belongs to the family of lyases, specifically the hydro-lyases, which cleave carbon-oxygen bonds. The systematic name of this enzyme class is scytalone 7,8-hydro-lyase (1,3,8-trihydroxynaphthalene-forming). This enzyme is also called scytalone 7,8-hydro-lyase.

== Structural studies ==
As of late 2007, 8 structures have been solved for this class of enzymes, with PDB accession codes 1IDP, 1STD, 2STD, 3STD, 4STD, 5STD, 6STD, and 7STD.
