= Chapeckia =

Scientific classification
- Kingdom: Fungi
- Division: Ascomycota
- Class: Sordariomycetes
- Order: Diaporthales
- Family: Sydowiellaceae
- Genus: Chapeckia; M.E.Barr (1978)

Type species
- Chapeckia nigrospora (Peck) M.E.Barr (1978)

Genus of fungi

Chapeckia is a genus of fungi in the family Sydowiellaceae. The genus was described by mycologist Margaret Elizabeth Barr-Bigelow in 1978.

The genus name of Chapeckia is in honour of Charles Horton Peck (1833–1917), who was an American mycologist. He had described over 2,700 species of North American fungi.

== Species ==
As accepted by Species Fungorum;

- Chapeckia nigrospora (Peck) M.E. Barr (1978)
- Chapeckia ribesia (Sacc. & Scalia) M.E. Barr (1978)
