= Phoma herbarum =

Scientific classification
- Kingdom: Fungi
- Division: Ascomycota
- Class: Dothideomycetes
- Order: Pleosporales
- Family: Didymellaceae
- Genus: Phoma
- Species: P. herbarum

Binomial name
- Phoma herbarum Westend.

Synonyms
- Aposphaeria violacea Bertel 1904; Phoma violacea (Bertel) Eveleigh 1961; Phoma hibernica Grimes, M. O'Connor & Cummins 1932; Phoma lignicola Rennerf. 1937; Phoma oleracea Sacc. 1880; Phoma pigmentivora Massee 1911; Pyrenochaeta mali M.A. Sm. 1963; Atradidymella muscivora M.L. Davey & Currah 2009

Species of fungus

Phoma herbarum is a species of saphrophytic fungi from the family Didymellaceae. The species is widely distributed and has been isolated from plants, soil, freshwater, and marine environments. P. herbarum is best known as a plant-associated fungus and opportunistic plant pathogen, but it has also been reported as a pathogen of fish.

== Plant association ==
P. herbarum is a plant pathogen infecting various plant species, including Alchemilla vulgaris, Arabis petraea, Arenaria norvegica, Armeria maritima, Bartsia alpina, Capsella bursa-pastoris, Erysimum, Euphrasia frigida, Honckenya peploides, Matricaria maritima, Rumex longifolius, Thymus praecox and Urtica dioica.

== Disease in fish ==
While normally considered a plant pathogen, Phoma herbarum is also a pathogen in fish, especially salmonids. In fish, P. herbarum causes a systemic mycotic infection known as phaeohyphomycosis. The primary organ infected is the air bladder; however, the disease can eventually disseminate to other organs. The low incidence of infection in experimentally infected fish suggest that P. herbarum is only weakly contagious.

Phoma herbarum has been isolated from coho salmon (Oncorhynchus kisutch), chinook salmon (Oncorhynchus tshawytscha), and rainbow trout (Salmo gairdneri). The species was identified as the causative agent of a phaeohyphomycosis outbreak in striped bass (Morone saxatilis) in the United States in 2007.

=== Signs and symptoms ===
Clinical signs include swollen and hemorrhagic vents and fins. The abdominal area of infected fish can be laterally compressed into a "pinched abdomen" appearance.

=== Prognosis ===
There is no known treatment for Phoma herbarum infections in fish and infected fish will eventually die.

== In humans ==
Infections in humans due to fungi from the genus Phoma are rare. Phoma species isolated from clinical specimens often aren't speciated beyond genus level and so the frequency of P. herbarum infections is uncertain. The pathogenicity of P. herbarum is unknown. The species likely acts as an opportunistic pathogen, requiring trauma to cause infection.

In 2010 P. herbarum was isolated from a case of foot dermatomycosis infection.
