= Thyrostroma =

Scientific classification
- Kingdom: Fungi
- Division: Ascomycota
- Class: Dothideomycetes
- Order: Botryosphaeriales
- Family: Botryosphaeriaceae
- Genus: Thyrostroma; Höhn. 1911

Species
- See text.

Genus of fungi

Thyrostroma is a genus of fungi in the family Botryosphaeriaceae. There are 19 species.

== Species ==
- Thyrostroma acanthophylli
- Thyrostroma astragali
- Thyrostroma compactum
- Thyrostroma ephedrae
- Thyrostroma eucalypti
- Thyrostroma halimodendri
- Thyrostroma jatrophae
- Thyrostroma kosaroffii
- Thyrostroma macrosporum
- Thyrostroma mori
- Thyrostroma negundinis
- Thyrostroma obtectum
- Thyrostroma piskorzii
- Thyrostroma ramoconidiiferum
- Thyrostroma salicis
- Thyrostroma sirokoffii
- Thyrostroma speciosum
- Thyrostroma utahense
- Thyrostroma vleugelianum
