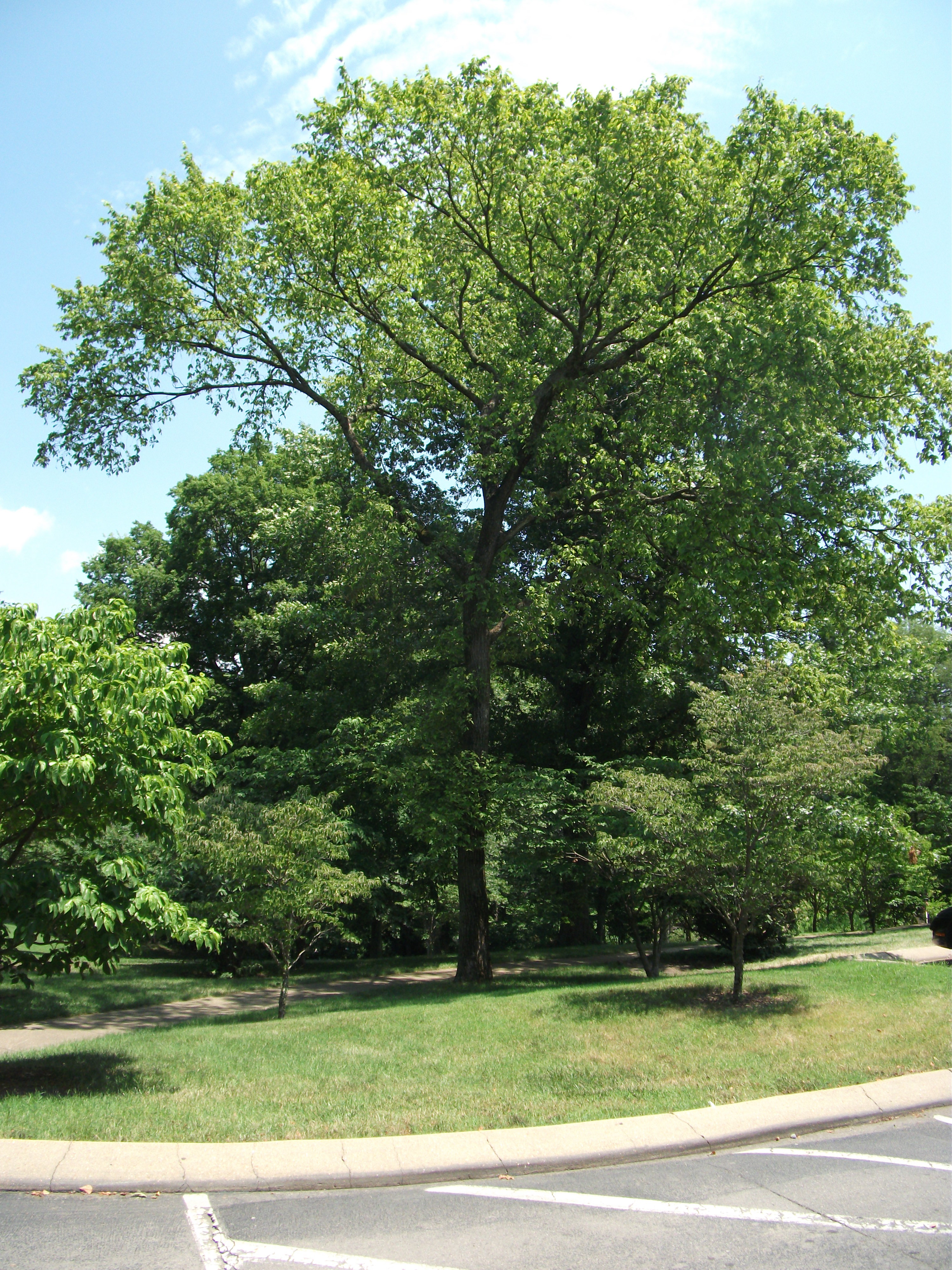
- Ulmus serotina, Cheekwood, Nashville, TN

Conservation status
- Least Concern (IUCN 3.1)

Scientific classification
- Kingdom: Plantae
- Clade: Tracheophytes
- Clade: Angiosperms
- Clade: Eudicots
- Clade: Rosids
- Order: Rosales
- Family: Ulmaceae
- Genus: Ulmus
- Subgenus: U. subg. Oreoptelea
- Section: U. sect. Chaetoptelea
- Species: U. serotina

Binomial name
- Ulmus serotina Sarg.
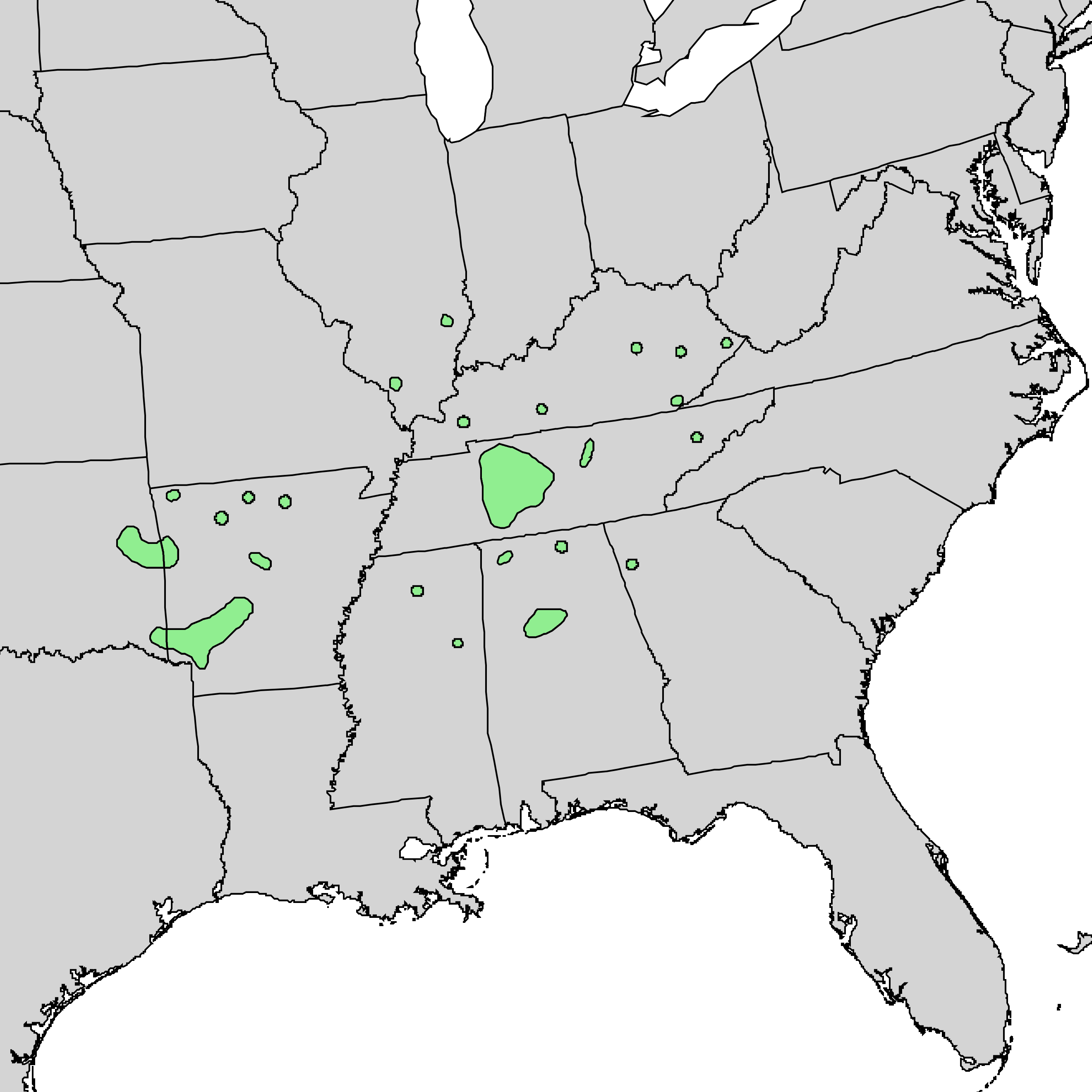
- Generalized natural range of Ulmus serotina in the US

Synonyms
- Ulmus divaricata C.H.Mull.; Ulmus multinervosa C.H.Mull.

= Ulmus serotina =

Species of tree

Ulmus serotina, the September elm, is an autumn-flowering North American species of tree. It is uncommon beyond Tennessee; it is only very locally distributed through Illinois, Kentucky, Arkansas, Mississippi, Oklahoma, Alabama, and Georgia, and disjunct populations into Nuevo León, Mexico. It grows predominantly on limestone bluffs and along streams to elevations of 400 m.

== Description ==
Rarely exceeding 20 m in height, the tree has a rounded crown with spreading to pendulous branches. The glabrous young shoots become progressively corky-winged with age, and bear oblong to obovate leaves <8 cm long. The wind-pollinated apetalous perfect flowers form pendulous racemes, which open in September and serve to distinguish the species from its cogenitor, the cedar elm U. crassifolia, with which it readily hybridizes. The samarae are oblong-elliptical, 10–15 mm in length, deeply divided at the apex, and ripen in November.

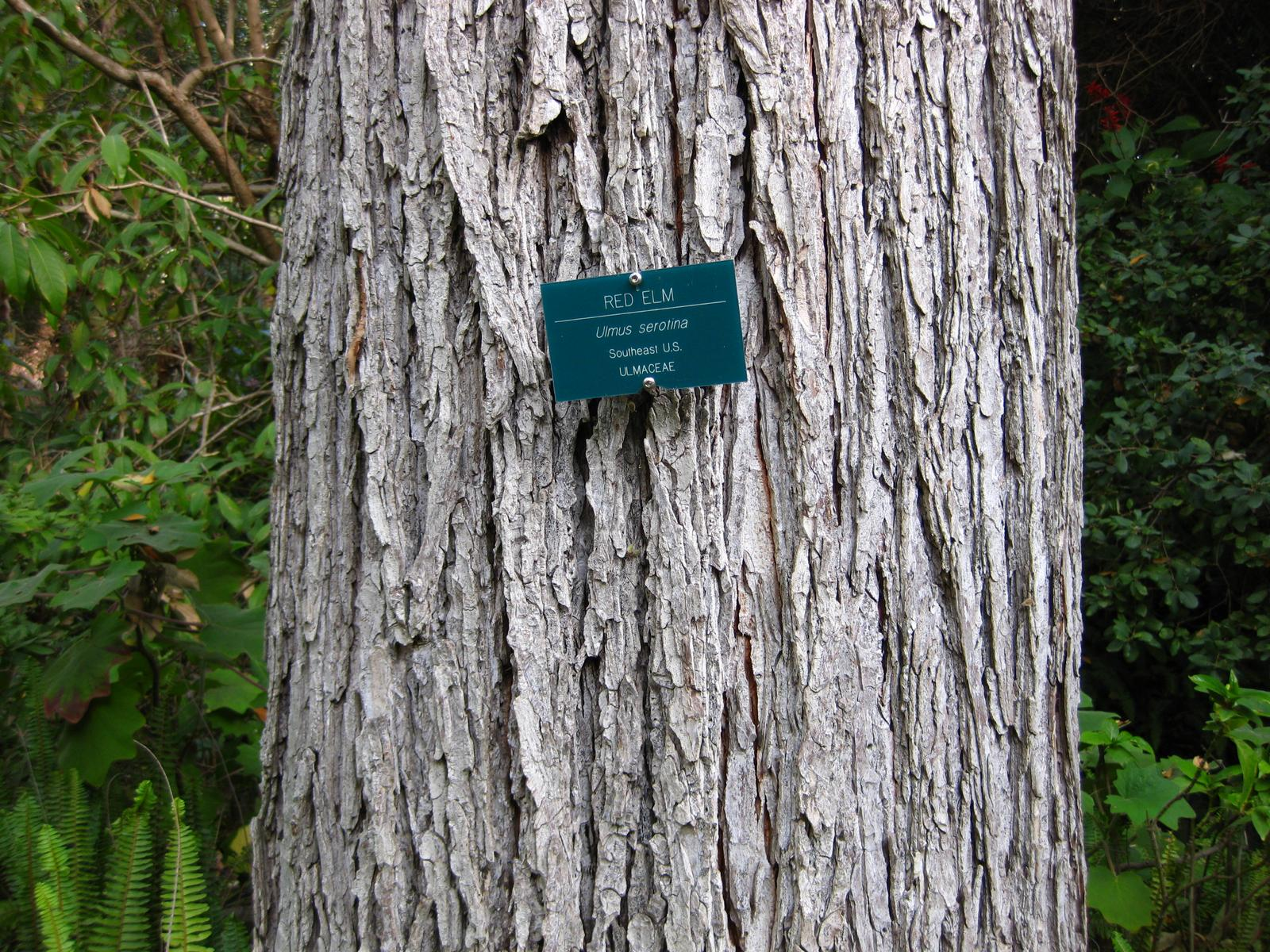
U. serotina bark

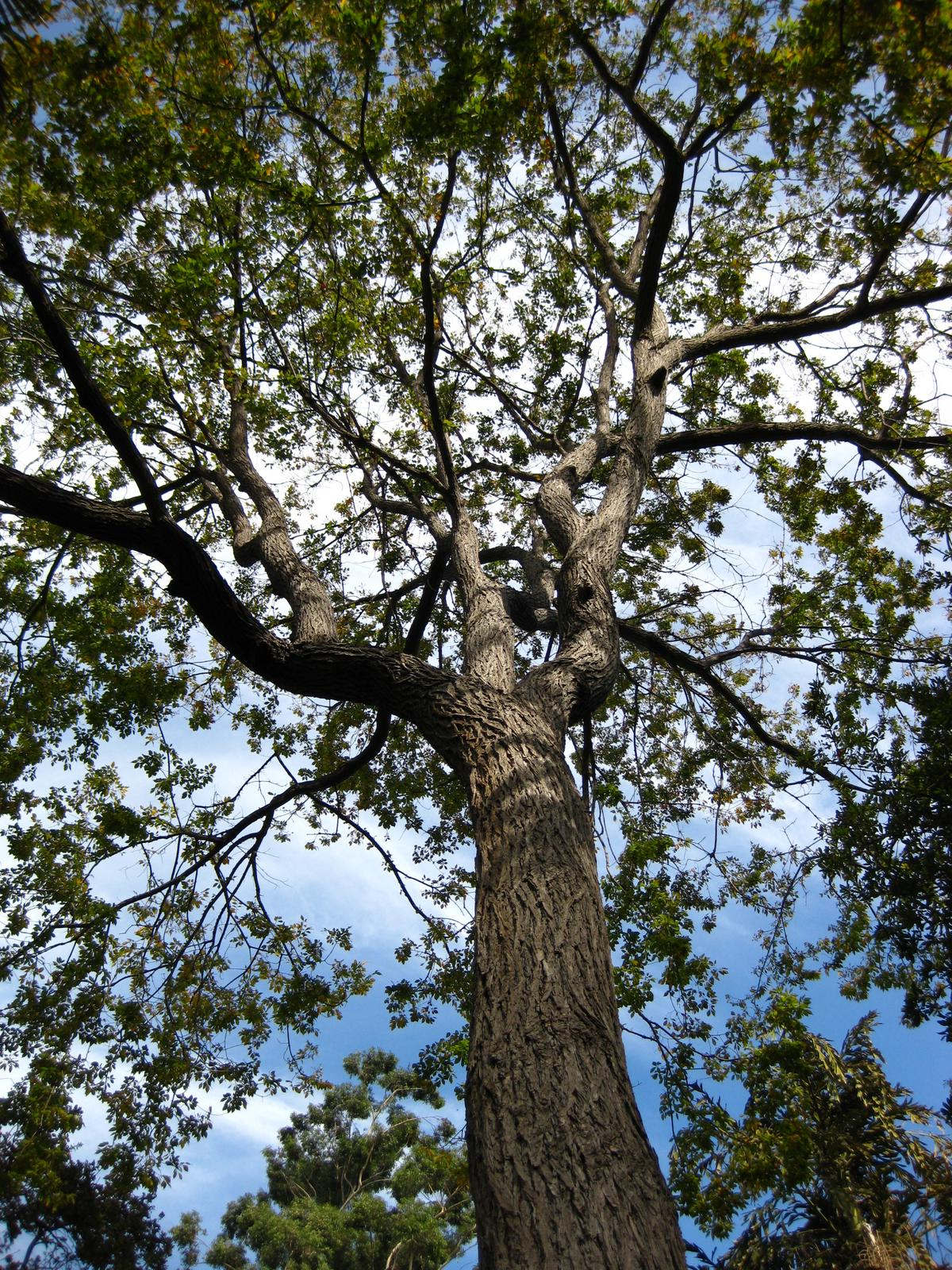
Bole of same

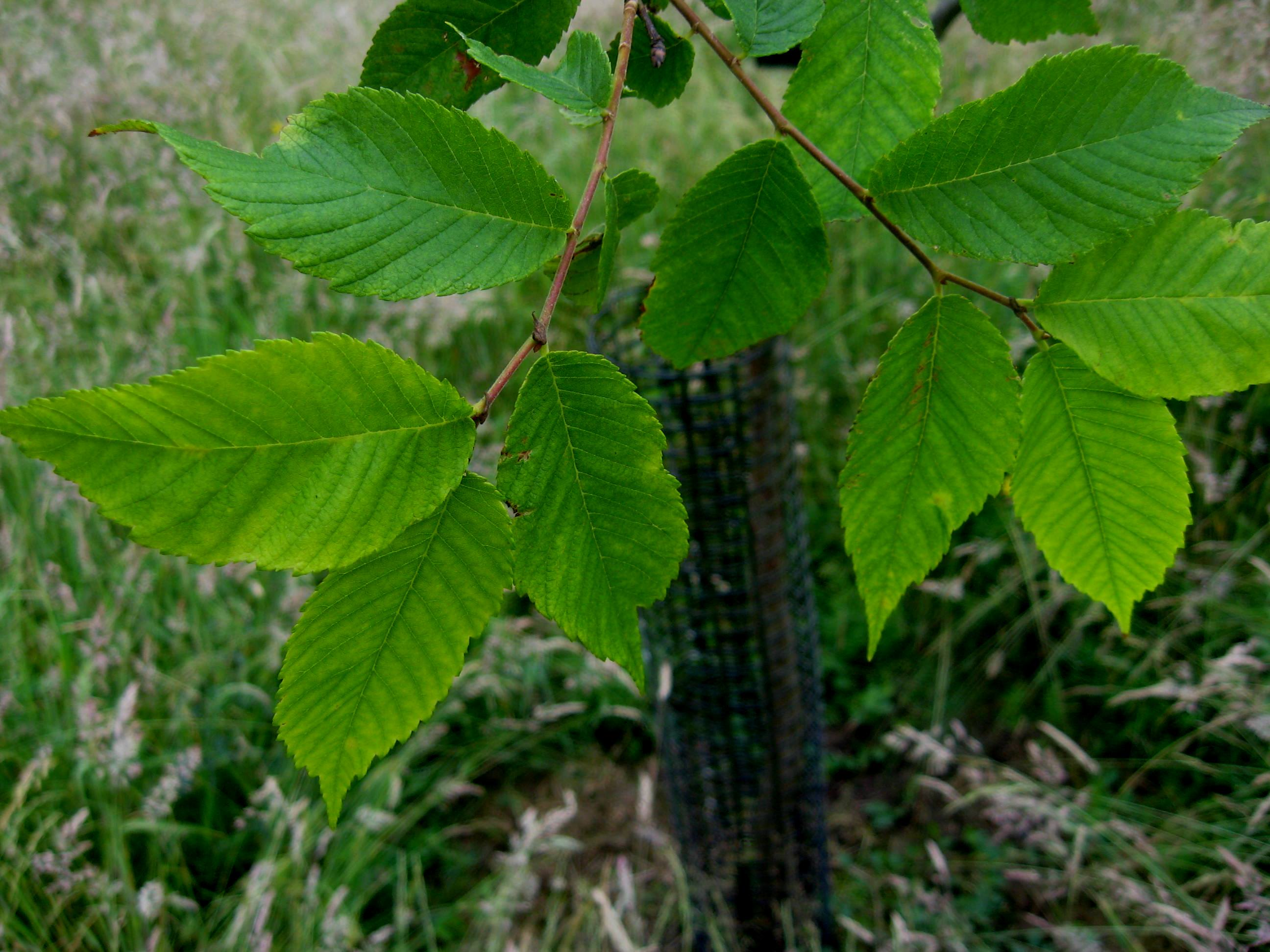
U. serotina foliage

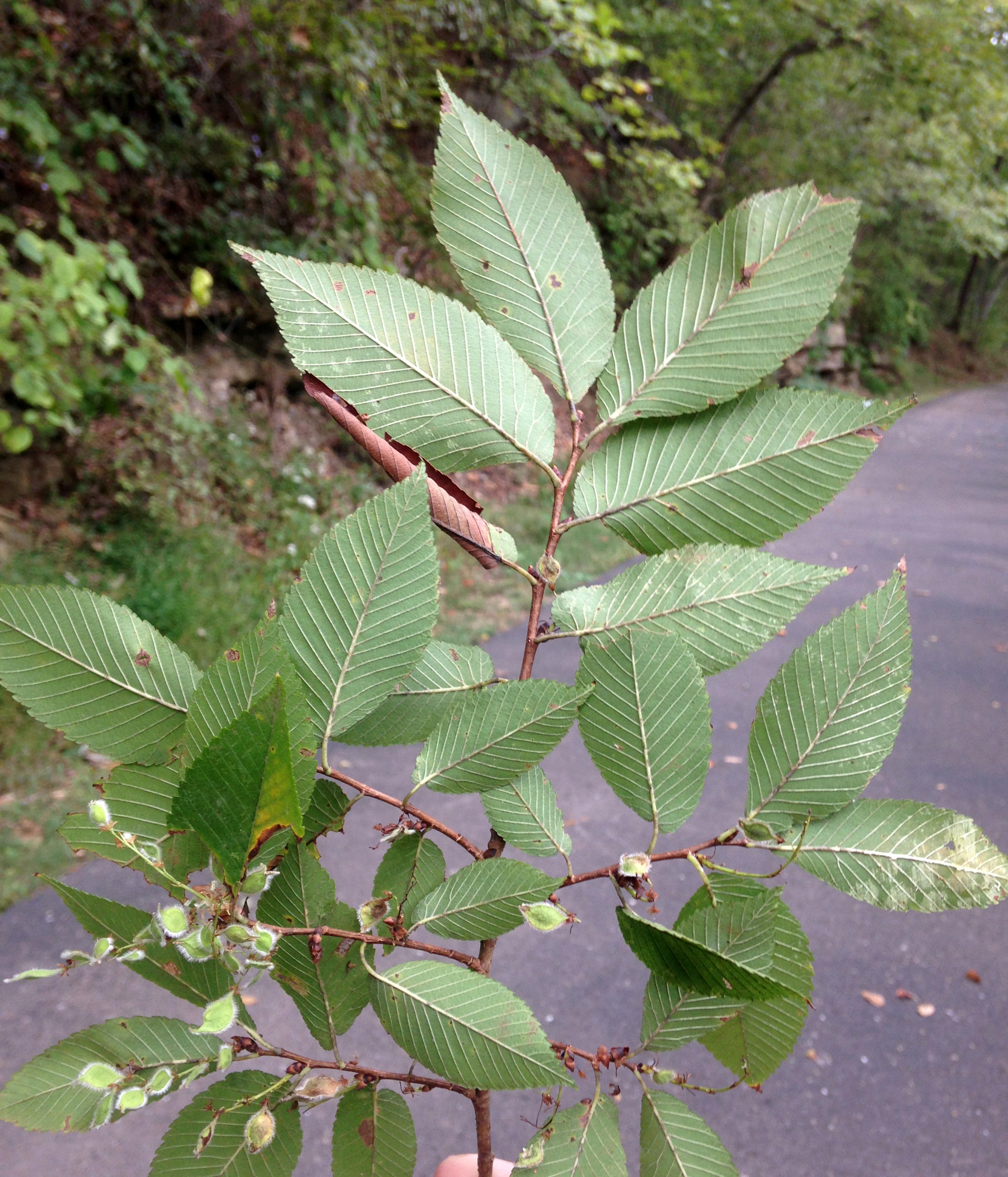
U. serotina in fruit

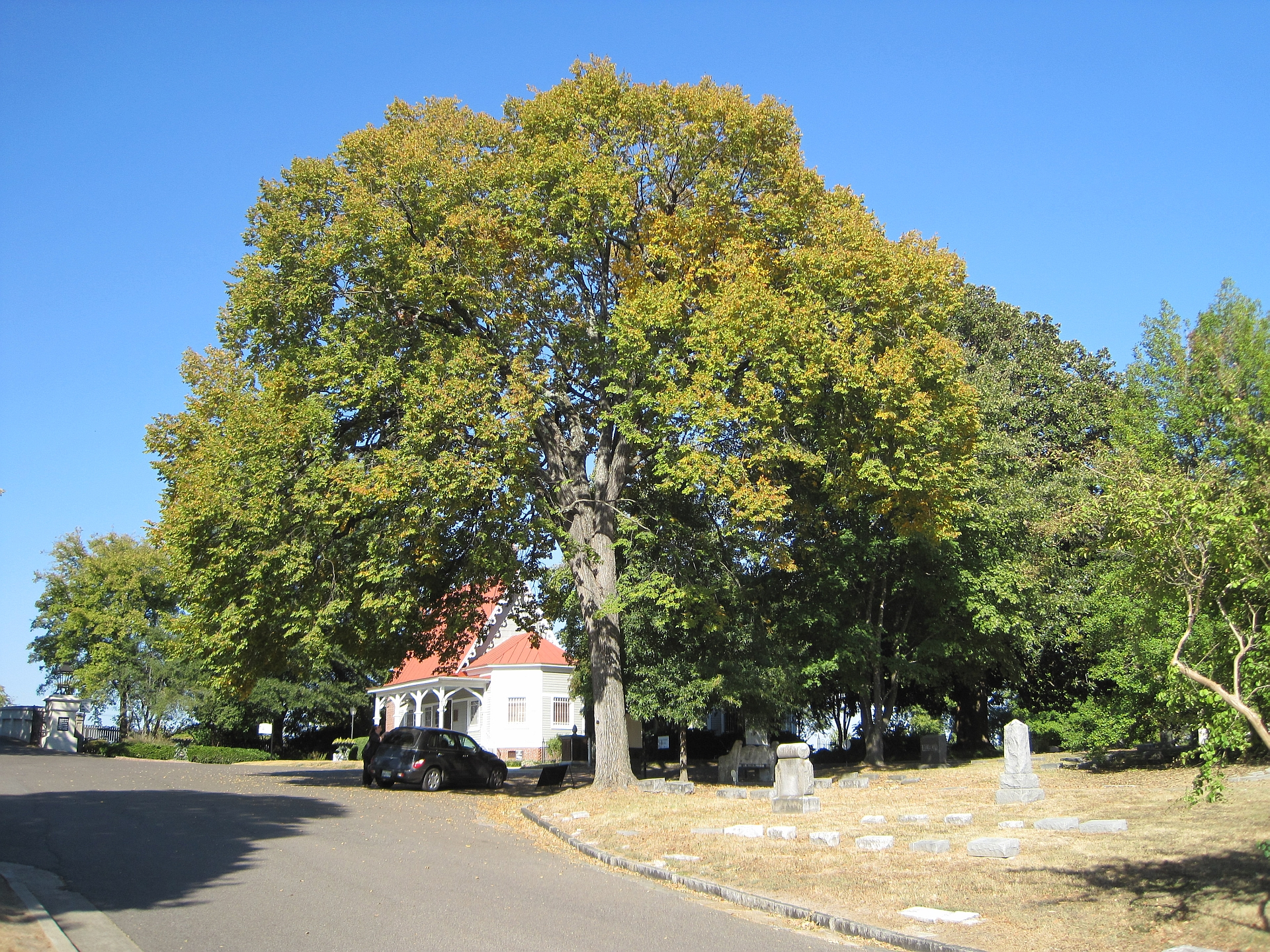
September elm in October, Elmwood Cemetery, Memphis, Tennessee (2010)

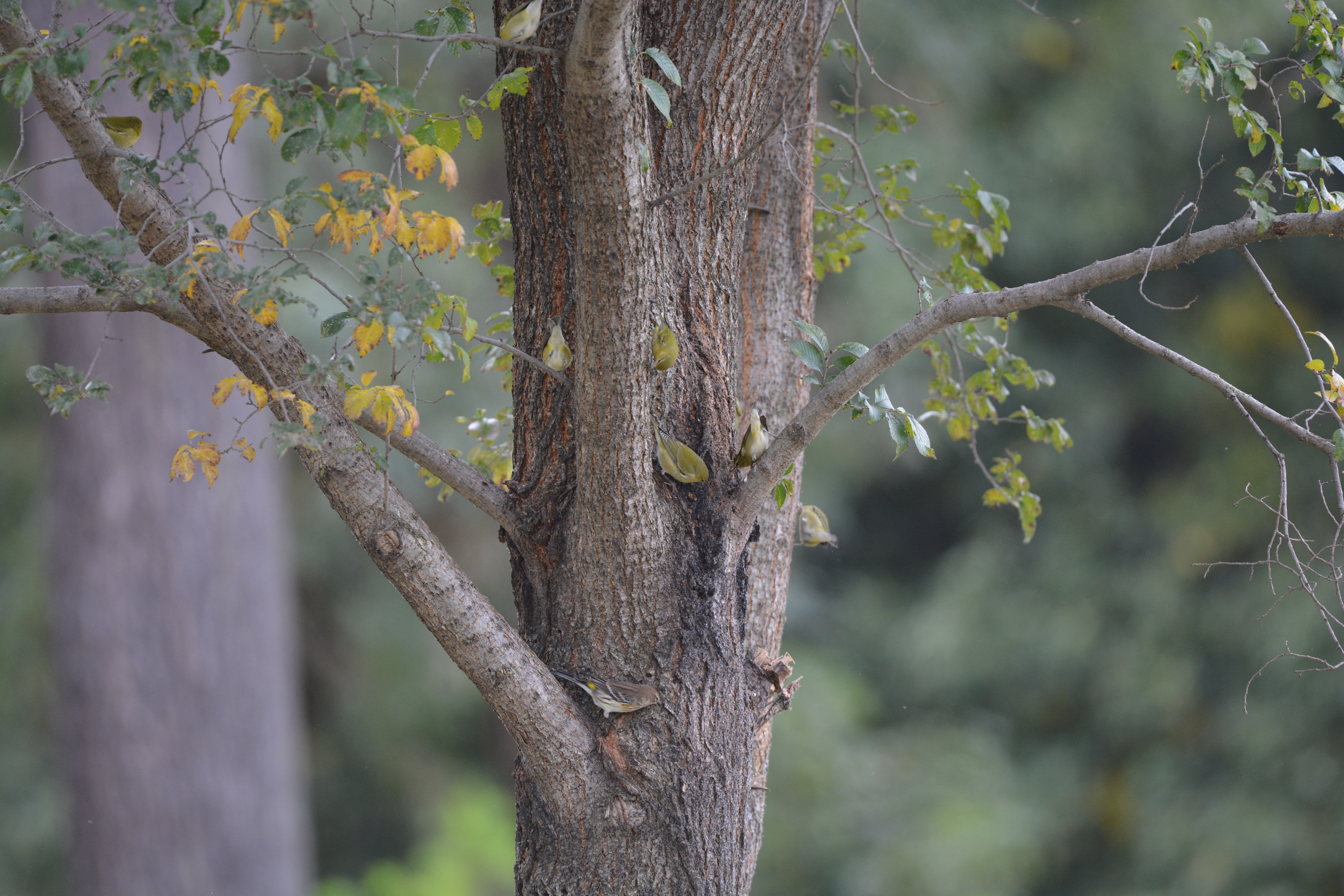
Bark of young September elm, with Tennessee warblers

== Pests and diseases ==
The species is highly susceptible to Dutch elm disease.

== Cultivation ==
Before the outbreak of Dutch elm disease, U. serotina enjoyed limited popularity as a shade tree in the southern part of its range. The tree grows well on most soils, but is intolerant of anaerobic or saline conditions; it is also frost tolerant to -30°C (-23°F). The September elm is very rare in cultivation in Europe; it was briefly propagated and marketed in the UK by the Hillier and Sons nursery, Winchester, Hampshire, from 1972 to 1977, when 16 were sold. It is not known to have been introduced to Australasia. No cultivars of this taxon are known, nor is it known to be in commerce.

== Notable trees ==
- The current US national champion, measuring 28.65 meters high in 2013, grows in the Spring Grove Cemetery in Hamilton County, Ohio.
- The former national champion measured at 25.5 m high in 2007, grows in Davidson County, Tennessee.

== Hybrids ==
- Ulmus × arkansana [: U. serotina × U. crassifolia ]. Present in Arkansas and Oklahoma.

== Accessions ==
North America

- Mildred E. Mathias Botanical Garden, UCLA, Los Angeles, California, US. (No details available)
- Morton Arboretum, US. Acc. no. 1039-23.
- U S National Arboretum , Washington, D.C., US. Acc. no. 55431.

Europe

- Grange Farm Arboretum, Sutton St James, Spalding, Lincolnshire, UK. Acc. no. not known.
- Royal Botanic Garden Edinburgh, UK. Acc. no. 20080091, from seed wild collected in USA.
- Royal Botanic Gardens, Kew, UK. Acc. no. not known.
- Royal Botanic Gardens, Wakehurst Place, UK. Acc. no. 2006-143.
- Sir Harold Hillier Gardens, UK. Acc. no. 2004.1059, 3 trees, collected in Tennessee, 2004.
- Thenford House arboretum, Banbury, UK. No details available.
- University of Copenhagen, Botanic Garden, Denmark. No details available.
