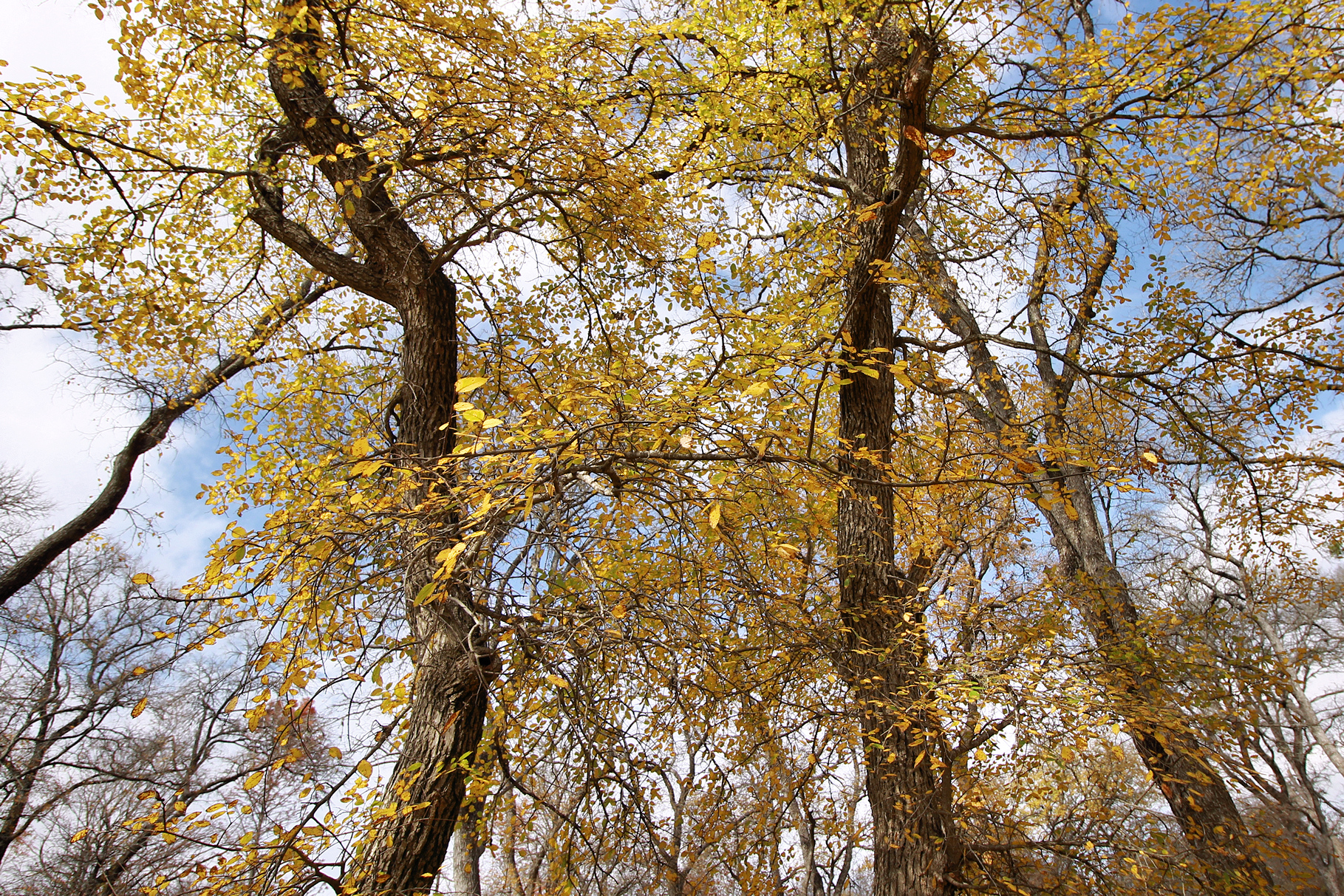
- Ulmus crassifolia McKinney Falls State Park, Austin, Texas.

Conservation status
- Least Concern (IUCN 3.1)

Scientific classification
- Kingdom: Plantae
- Clade: Tracheophytes
- Clade: Angiosperms
- Clade: Eudicots
- Clade: Rosids
- Order: Rosales
- Family: Ulmaceae
- Genus: Ulmus
- Subgenus: U. subg. Oreoptelea
- Section: U. sect. Chaetoptelea
- Species: U. crassifolia

Binomial name
- Ulmus crassifolia Nutt.
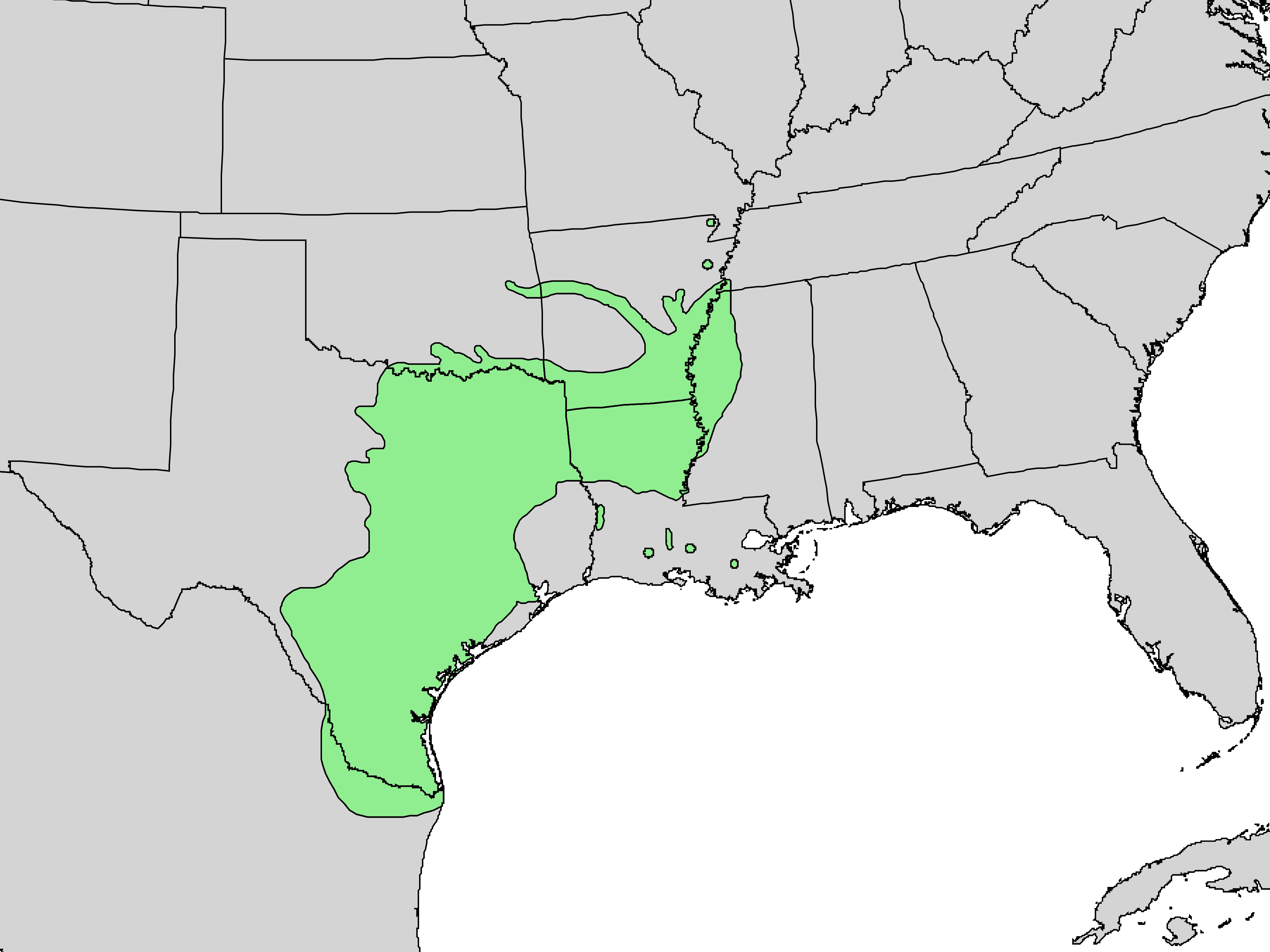
- Natural range (Florida population excluded)

Synonyms
- Ulmus monterreyensis Mull.; Ulmus opaca Nutt.

= Ulmus crassifolia =

Species of tree

Ulmus crassifolia Nutt., the Texas cedar elm or simply cedar elm, is a deciduous tree native to south-central North America, mainly in southern and eastern Texas, southern Oklahoma, Arkansas, and Louisiana, with small populations in western Mississippi, southwest Tennessee, and north-central Florida; it also occurs in northeastern Mexico. It is the most common elm tree in Texas. The tree typically grows well in flat valley bottom areas referred to as cedar elm flats. Its Latin name refers to its comparatively thick (crassifoliate) leaves; the common name cedar elm is derived from the trees' association with juniper trees, locally known as cedars.

== Description ==
The cedar elm is a medium to large deciduous tree growing to 24–27 m tall with a rounded crown. The leaves are small, 2.5–5 cm long by 1.3–2 cm broad, with an oblique base, and distinguish it from Ulmus serotina with which it readily hybridizes in the wild. Leaf fall is late, often in early winter. The wind-pollinated apetalous perfect flowers are produced in the late summer or early fall; they are small and inconspicuous, with a reddish-purple color, and hang on slender stalks a third to a half inch long. The fruit is a small winged samara 8–10 mm long, downy on both surfaces at first, maturing quickly after the flowering in late fall.

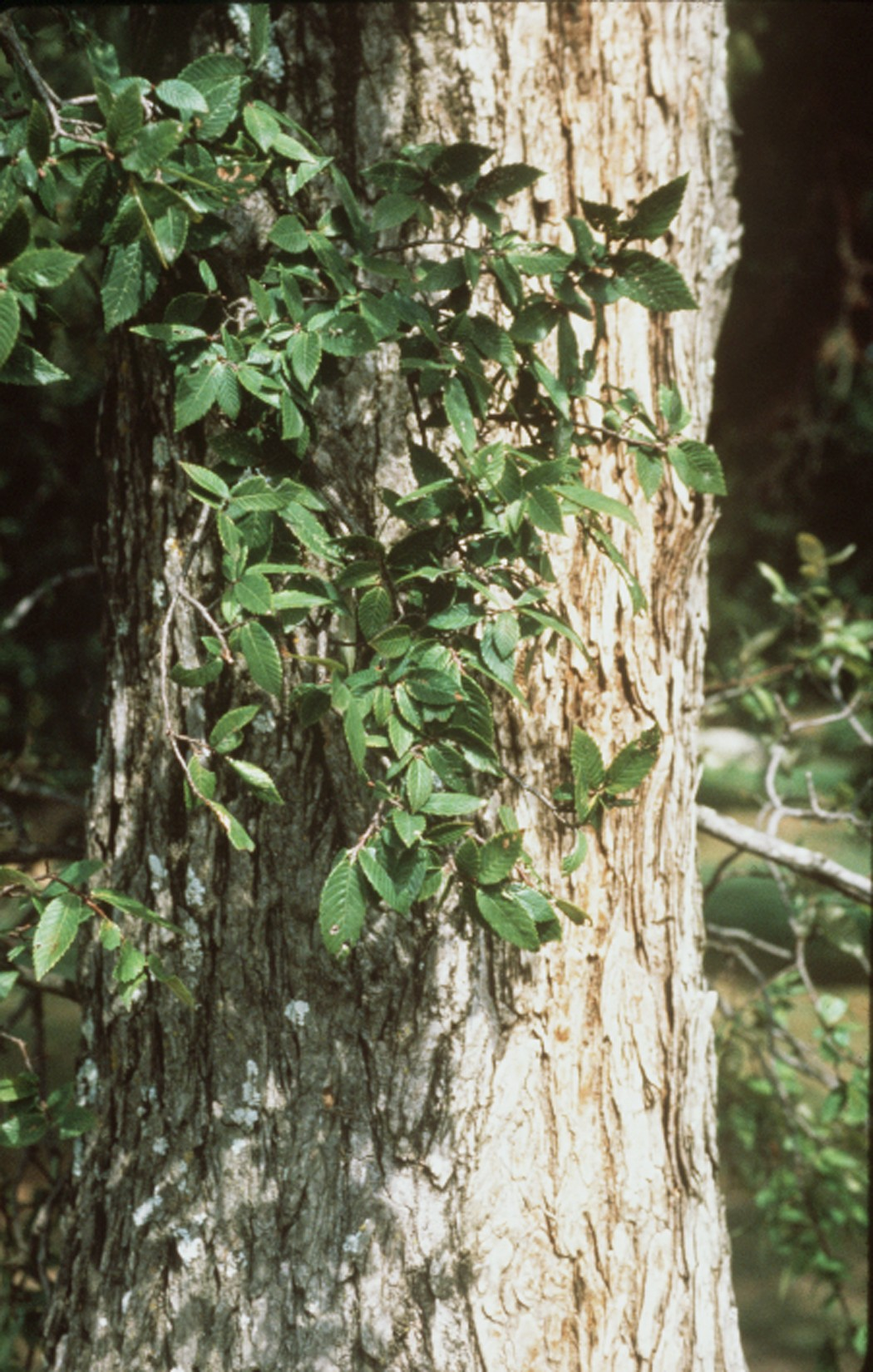
U. crassifolia bark

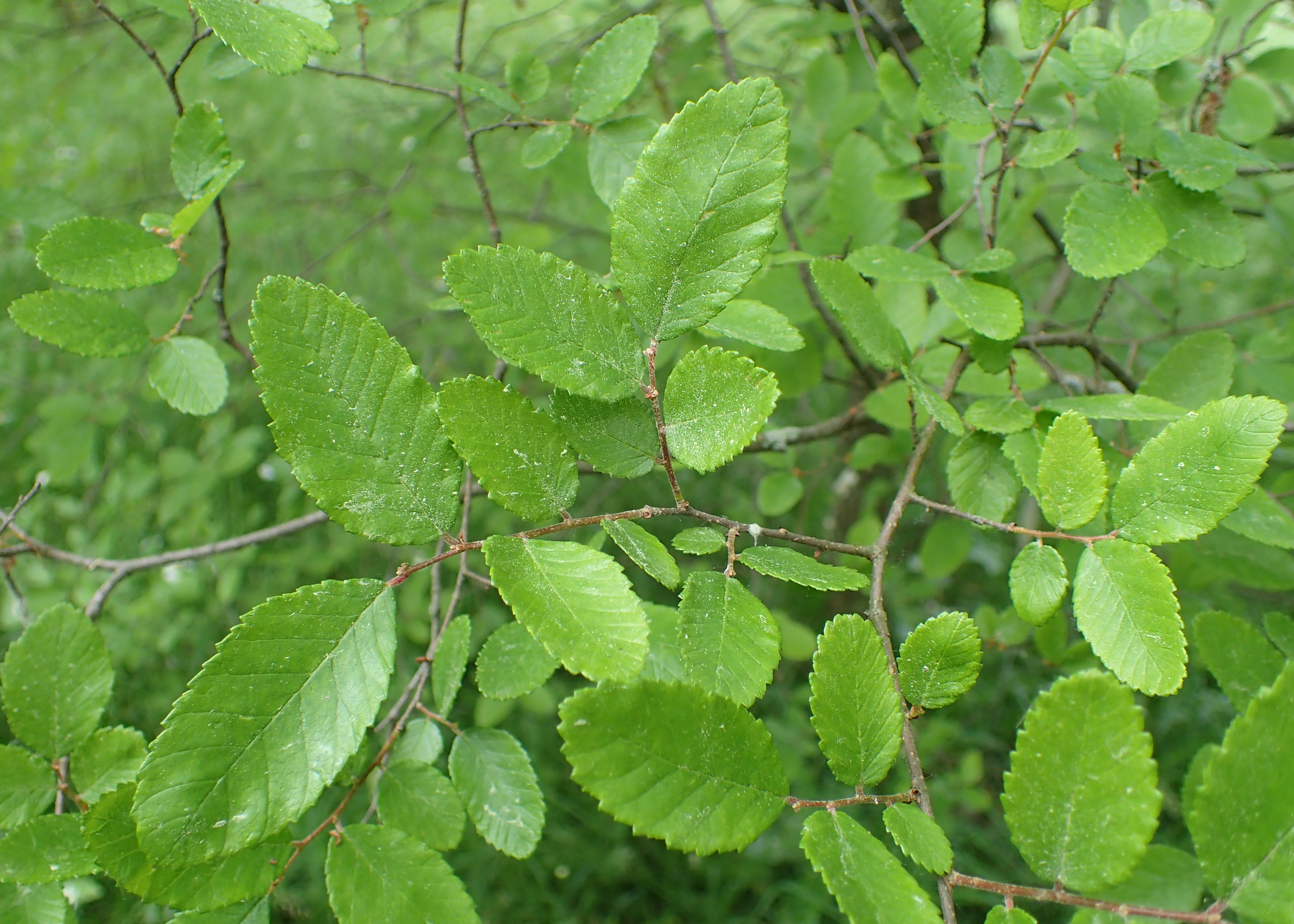
U. crassifolia foliage, Botanischer Garten, Berlin-Dahlem

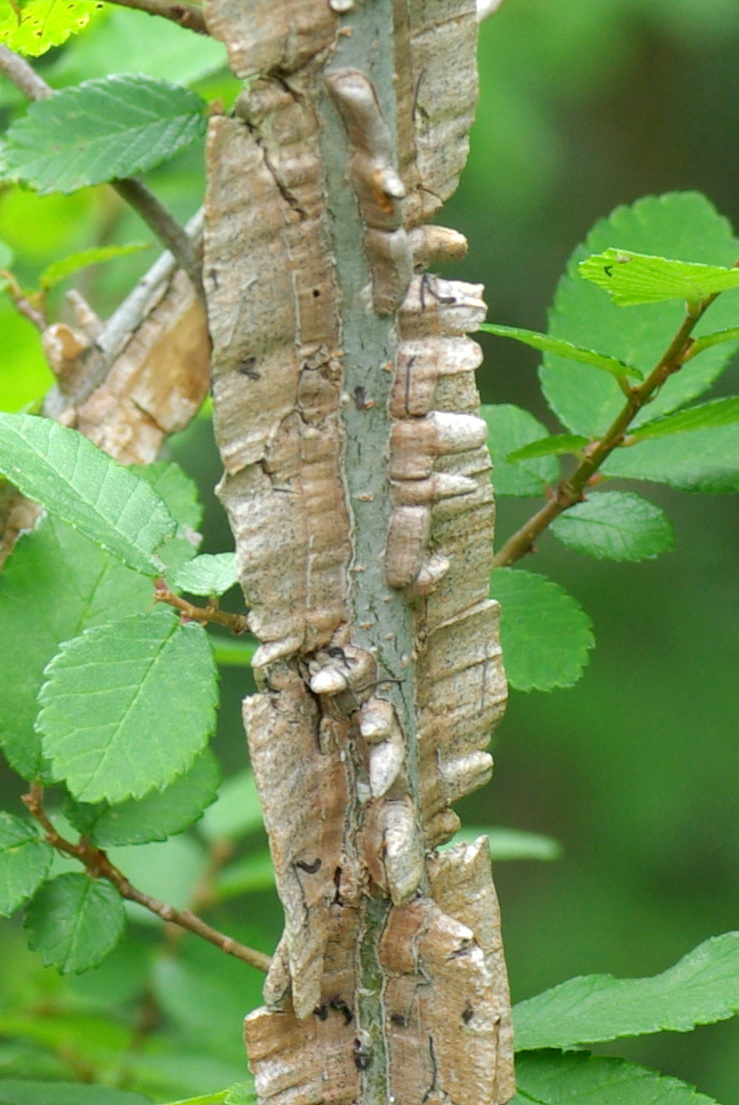
U. crassifolia branchlet, Spring Creek, Garland, Texas

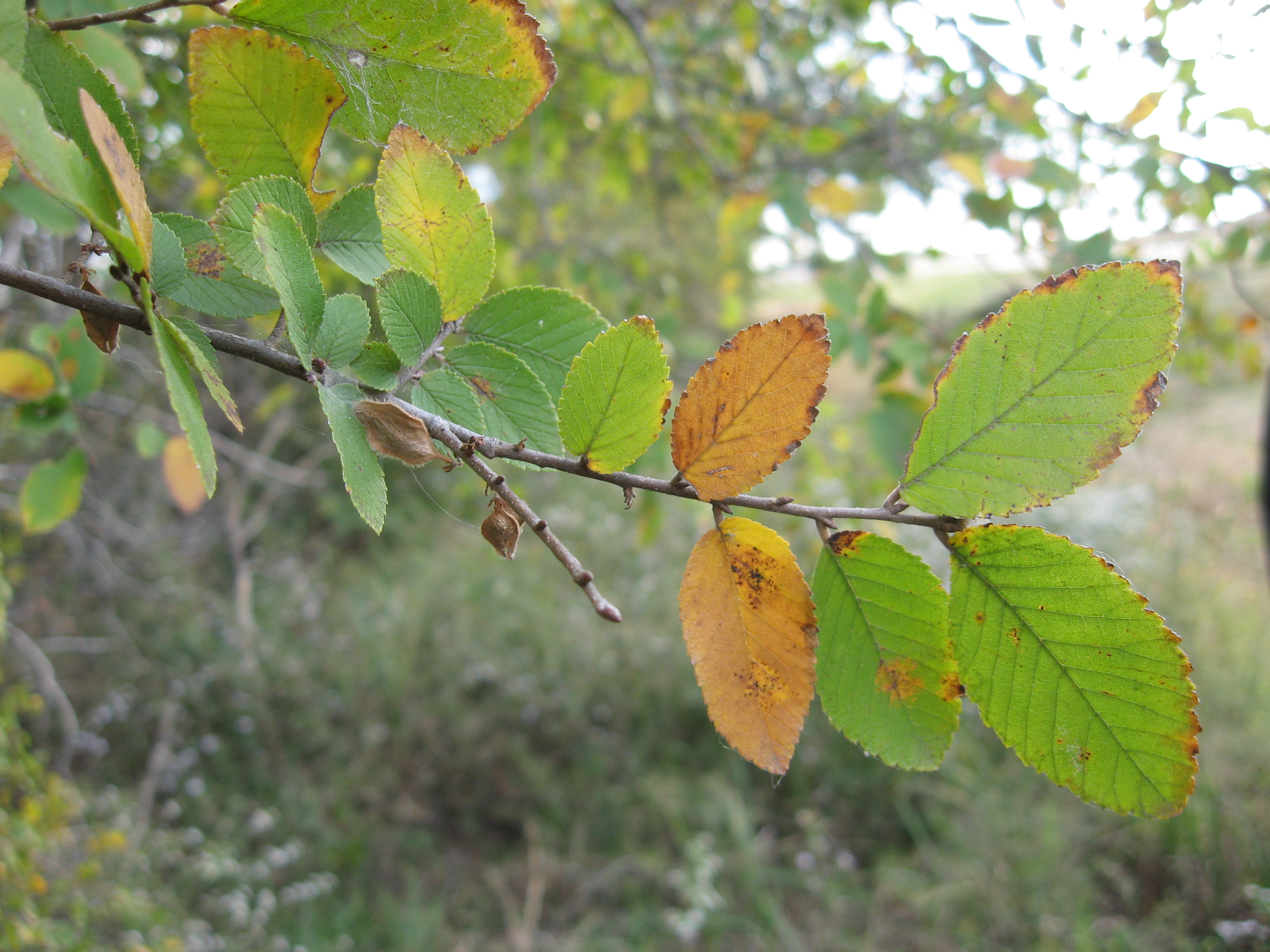
U. crassifolia leaves and fruit, November

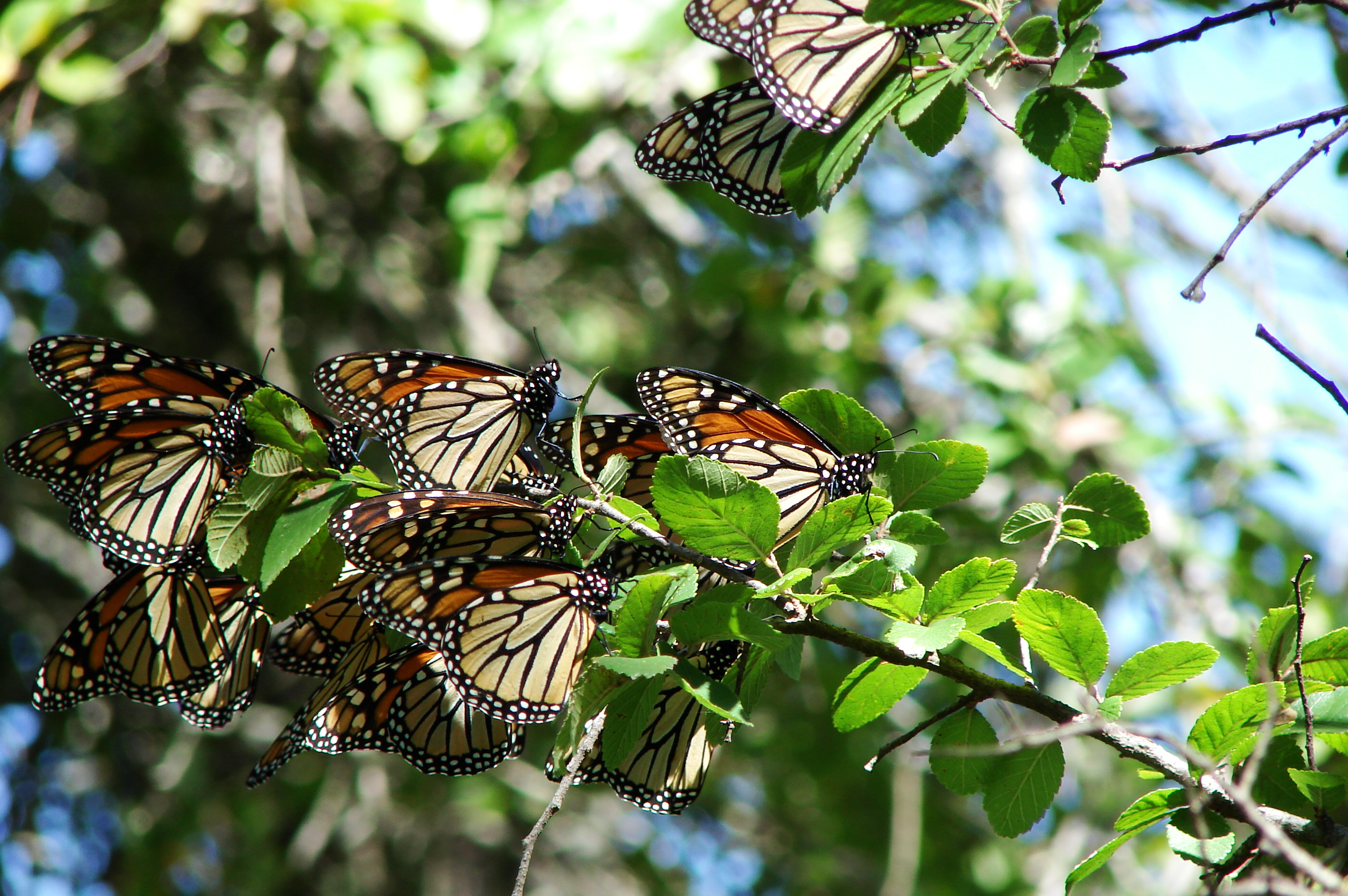
Migrating monarch butterflies on a cedar elm in central Texas

== Pests and diseases ==
Cedar elm is susceptible to Dutch elm disease (DED), though less so than American elm, and moderately damaged by the elm leaf beetle Xanthogaleruca luteola. The tree also suffers from a vascular wilt, the symptoms often confused with those of DED.

Cedar elms are very susceptible to mistletoe. Mistletoe is a parasite that roots itself into the vascular system of the tree, thus stealing valuable nutrients and water. In some cases, if not removed, the parasite can be devastating to large sections of trees and even fatal. They create club-like branches that die out at the ends. These "club" branches create openings for future pests such as the elm beetles and carpenter ants. No treatments are known to be safe enough to kill mistletoe without killing the tree. Removing the mistletoe manually is not a guarantee, but it is the best-known method for control.

Cedar elms are known to be highly immune to Texas root rot caused by the fungus Phymatotrichopsis omnivora. Because of this, it is usually planted in regions where P. omnivora is prevalent, since the closely related lacebark elm is highly susceptible and easily killed by the fungus.

== Cultivation ==
U. crassifolia is extremely rare in cultivation in Europe and Australasia. Specimens were supplied by the Späth nursery of Berlin from the late 19th century. Henry (1913) and Bean (1988) note that it does not thrive in northern Europe, where the branchlets often die back. Three trees supplied by Späth to the Royal Botanic Garden Edinburgh in 1902 as U. crassifolia may survive in Edinburgh, as it was the practice of the garden to distribute trees about the city (viz. the Wentworth elm).

== Notable trees ==
The US national champion, measuring 37 m high in 2001, grows in the Meeman-Shelby Forest State Park, Tennessee.

== Cultivars ==
- 'Brazos Rim'.

== Hybrids ==
- Ulmus × arkansana [: U. crassifolia × U. serotina ]. Present in Arkansas and Oklahoma.

== Accessions ==
=== North America ===
- Arnold Arboretum, US. Acc. nos. 511–2002, 758–86, both wild collected
- Chicago Botanic Garden, US. No details available.
- Bartlett Tree Experts, US. Acc. no. 90–1243, unrecorded provenance.
- Morton Arboretum, US. Acc. no. 385–68, 14-86
- New York Botanical Garden, US. Acc. no. 79617, unrecorded provenance.
- U S National Arboretum, Washington, D.C., US. Acc. no. 37834

=== Europe ===
- Grange Farm Arboretum, Lincolnshire, UK. Acc. no. 509
- Royal Botanic Garden Edinburgh, UK. Acc. no. 20080090, from seed wild collected in US.
- Sir Harold Hillier Gardens, UK. Acc. no. 1980–0443, (Brentry Field).
- University of Copenhagen Botanic Garden, Denmark. No details available.

=== Australasia ===
- Manukau Cemetery & Crematorium, Auckland, New Zealand. No details available.

== Nurseries ==
=== North America ===
Widely available

=== Europe ===
- Arboretum Waasland, Nieuwkerken-Waas, Belgium.

=== Australasia ===
None known.
