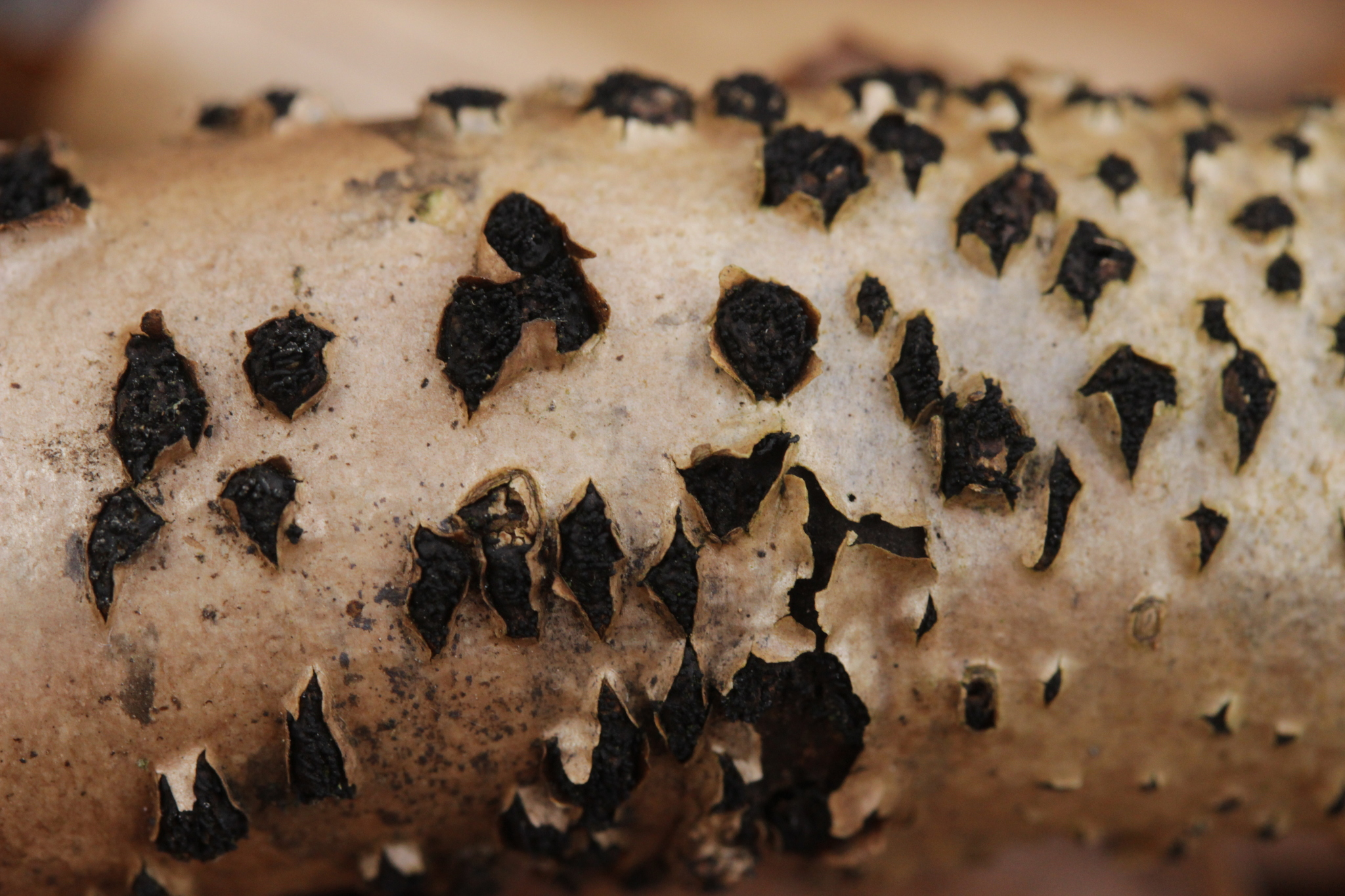
- Sillia ferruginea

Scientific classification
- Kingdom: Fungi
- Division: Ascomycota
- Class: Sordariomycetes
- Order: Diaporthales
- Family: Sydowiellaceae
- Genus: Sillia; P. Karst.

Type species
- Sillia ferruginea (Pers.) P. Karst.

Species
- See text

= Sillia =

Genus of fungi

Sillia is a genus of fungi within the Sydowiellaceae family.

== Species ==
As accepted by Species Fungorum;

- Sillia albofusca Höhn. (1918)
- Sillia biformis Rick (1906)
- Sillia celastrina R. Rao (1971)
- Sillia ferruginea (Pers.) P. Karst. (1873)
- Sillia italica N.I. de Silva, Camporesi & K.D. Hyde (2017)
- Sillia kamatii Tilak, S.B. Kale & S.V.S. Kale (1970)
- Sillia karstenii Senan., Camporesi & K.D. Hyde (2017)
- Sillia theae Hara (1919)

Former species;

- S. betulina Bubák & Vleugel (1911) = Vleugelia betulina, Sordariomycetes
- S. cinctula (Cooke & Peck) Höhn. (1918) = Tortilispora cinctula, Sydowiellaceae
- S. longipes (Tul. & C. Tul.) Lar.N. Vassiljeva (1994) = Pseudovalsa longipes, Coryneaceae
