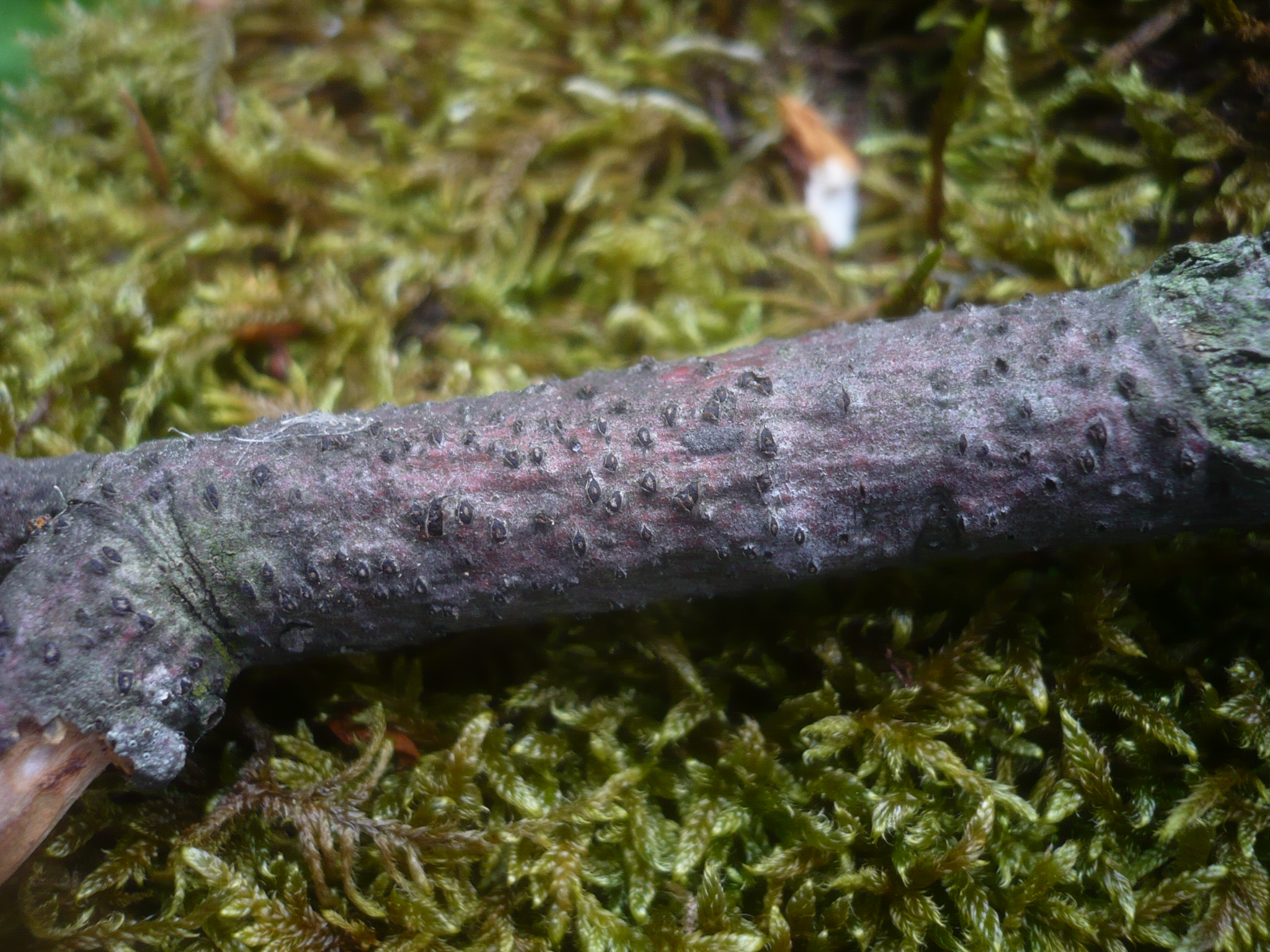
- Valsa ambiens on apple branch

Scientific classification
- Kingdom: Fungi
- Division: Ascomycota
- Class: Sordariomycetes
- Order: Diaporthales
- Family: Valsaceae
- Genus: Valsa
- Species: V. ambiens

Binomial name
- Valsa ambiens (Pers.) Fr., (1849)

Synonyms
- Cryptodiaporthe populina (Fuckel) Petr., (1921); Cryptosporella populina (Fuckel) Sacc., (1879); Cytospora ambiens (Nitschke) Sacc., (1879); Cytospora germanica Sacc., (1884); Cytospora microstoma Sacc., (1884); Cytospora populina Rabenh. Cytospora rhodophila Sacc., (1884); Sphaeria ambiens Pers., (1801); Sphaeria diatrypa Fr., (1823); Sphaeria microstoma Pers., (1801); Sphaeria tetraspora sensu Currey p.p.; fide Cannon, Hawksworth & Sherwood-Pike (1985); Valsa ambiens Nitschke, (1867); Valsa ambiens subsp. ambiens (Pers.) Fr., (1849); Valsa ambiens var. betulae Plowr. Valsa ambiens var. carpini Cooke; Valsa ambiens var. coryli Sacc. Valsa ambiens var. crataegi Cooke; Valsa ambiens var. mali Sacc. Valsa ambiens var. populi Plowr. Valsa ambiens var. pyri Cooke; Valsa betulina Nitschke, (1870); Valsa diatrypa (Fr.) Fr., (1849); Valsa diatrypa Nitschke, (1849); Valsa microstoma (Pers.) Fr., (1849); Valsa microstoma Nitschke, (1849); Valsa opulina Sacc. & Speg., (1889); Valsa pauperata Cooke & Ellis, (1881); Valsa populina Fuckel, (1871); Valsa rhodophila Berk. & Broome, (1859); Valsa subseriata Cooke, (1885); Valsella diatrypa (Fr.) Z. Urb., (1957)

= Valsa ambiens =

Species of fungus

Valsa ambiens is a fungal pathogen which infects elms. It has also been identified causing valsa canker in apple trees.

== See also ==
- List of elm diseases
- List of apple diseases
