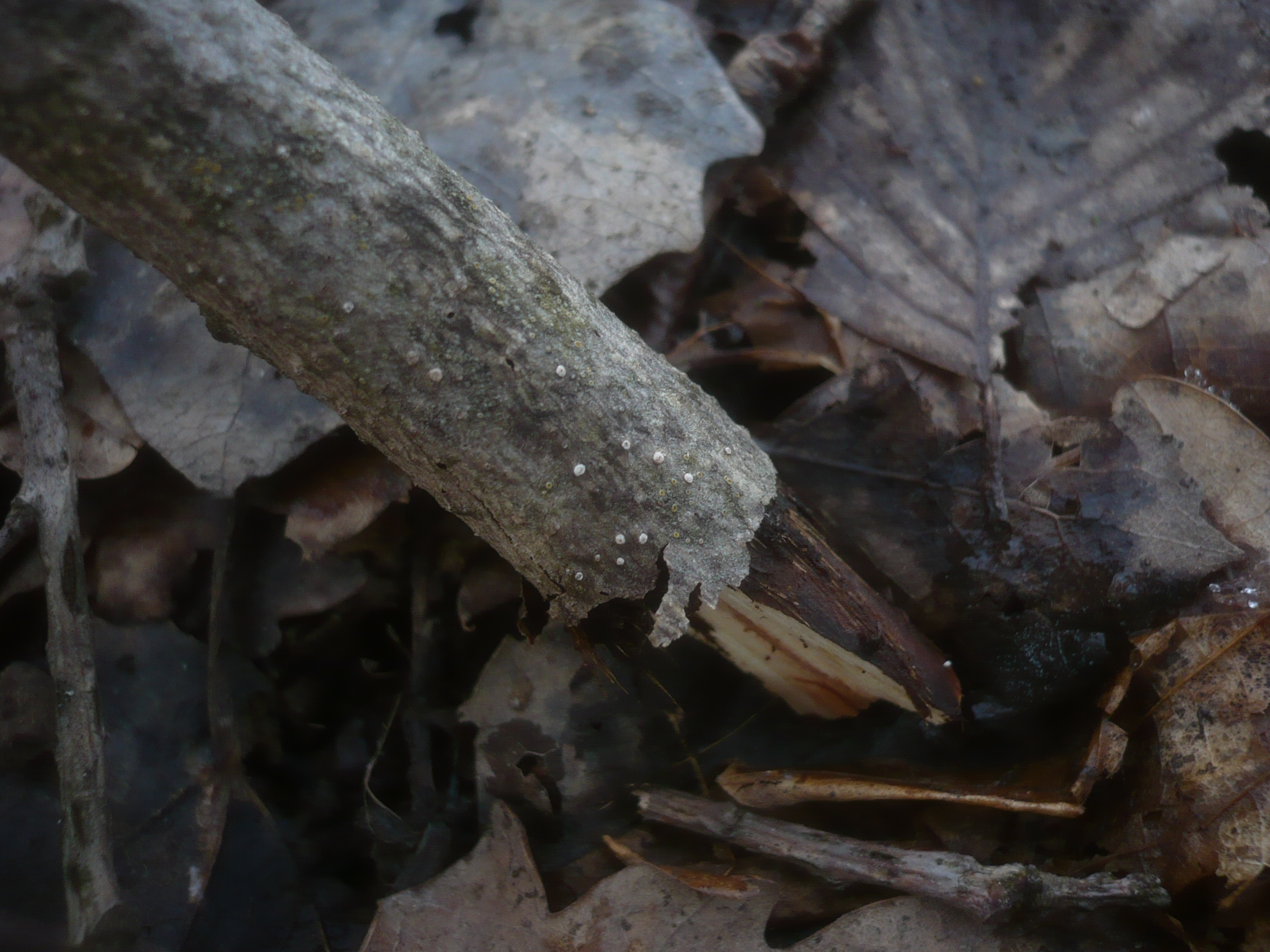
- Valsa nivea on aspen

Scientific classification
- Kingdom: Fungi
- Division: Ascomycota
- Class: Sordariomycetes
- Order: Diaporthales
- Family: Valsaceae
- Genus: Valsa
- Species: V. nivea

Binomial name
- Valsa nivea (Hoffm.) Fr., (1849)

Synonyms
- Cytospora nivea (Hoffm.) Sacc., (1881); Cytospora nivea Fuckel, (1870); Leucocytospora nivea (Hoffm.) T. Kobay.{?}, (1970); Leucostoma niveum (Hoffm.) Höhn., (1928); Sphaeria nivea Hoffm., (1787)

= Valsa nivea =

Species of fungus

Valsa nivea is a plant pathogen infecting elms.

== See also ==
- List of elm diseases
