= Aposphaeria =

Scientific classification
- Kingdom: Fungi
- Division: Ascomycota
- Class: Dothideomycetes
- Order: Pleosporales
- Family: Lophiostomataceae
- Genus: Aposphaeria; Sacc. (1880)

Type species
- Aposphaeria pulviscula (Sacc.) Sacc. (1880)

Genus of fungi

Aposphaeria is a genus of fungi in the family Lophiostomataceae. The genus was circumscribed in 1880 by Pier Andrea Saccardo, with Aposphaeria pulviscula selected as the type species.

== Species ==
As of December 2022, Species Fungorum (in the Catalog of Life) accepts 84 species of Aposphaeria:

- Aposphaeria allantella Sacc. & Roum. (1884)
- Aposphaeria anomala Rota-Rossi (1911)
- Aposphaeria arachidis R.L.Kulk. (1974)
- Aposphaeria bambusae Bres. (1926)
- Aposphaeria bombacis Allesch. (1912)
- Aposphaeria brunneotincta Farl. (1922)
- Aposphaeria buddlejae Gucevič (1959)
- Aposphaeria calligoni Kravtzev (1961)
- Aposphaeria canavaliae Massee (1906)
- Aposphaeria caraganae I.E.Brezhnev (1951)
- Aposphaeria caricicola R.Sprague (1962)
- Aposphaeria caulina P.Karst. (1905)
- Aposphaeria charticola Sacc. (1911)
- Aposphaeria cladoniae Allesch. & Schnabl (1895)
- Aposphaeria conica Sacc. (1886)
- Aposphaeria corallinolutea Gruyter, Aveskamp & Verkley (2012)
- Aposphaeria dendrophomoides Sacc. (1921)
- Aposphaeria denudata (Schulzer) Sacc. & Traverso (1910)
- Aposphaeria desertorum Kravtzev (1955)
- Aposphaeria elymi Died. (1912)
- Aposphaeria ephedrae Kravtzev (1961)
- Aposphaeria epicorticalis Sacc. (1921)
- Aposphaeria eragrostidis Castell. & Ciccar. (1939)
- Aposphaeria eurotiae Kravtzev (1961)
- Aposphaeria ferrum-equinum Tassi (1900)
- Aposphaeria freticola Speg. (1887)
- Aposphaeria gallicola Trotter (1900)
- Aposphaeria gregaria Died. (1912)
- Aposphaeria halimodendri Gucevič (1960)
- Aposphaeria haloxyli Kravtzev (1955)
- Aposphaeria hapalophragmii Trotter (1931)
- Aposphaeria henryana Traverso (1912)
- Aposphaeria heveae Petch (1917)
- Aposphaeria hippuridis Ade (1923)
- Aposphaeria hospitae Tassi (1900)
- Aposphaeria humicola Oudem. (1902)
- Aposphaeria ilicis Died. (1912)
- Aposphaeria iliensis Kravtzev (1961)
- Aposphaeria jubaeae Speg. (1921)
- Aposphaeria kiefferiana Trotter (1900)
- Aposphaeria kravtzevii Schwarzman (1970)
- Aposphaeria lentisci (Mont. & Durieu) Pat. (1904)
- Aposphaeria lignicola S.Ahmad (1964)
- Aposphaeria major Syd. & P.Syd. (1907)
- Aposphaeria majuscula Sacc. & Roum. ex Sacc. (1913)
- Aposphaeria martinii Aa (2002)
- Aposphaeria mediella P.Karst. (1884)
- Aposphaeria melaleucae Henn. (1903)
- Aposphaeria mesembryanthemi M.E.A.Costa & Sousa da Câmara (1952)
- Aposphaeria mojunkumica Kravtzev (1955)
- Aposphaeria montbretiae Siemaszko (1923)
- Aposphaeria musarum Speg. (1910)
- Aposphaeria nigra Died. (1912)
- Aposphaeria oxalidis M.L.Farr (1960)
- Aposphaeria pakistanica S.Ahmad (1971)
- Aposphaeria phellodendri Gucevič (1960)
- Aposphaeria pinea Sacc. (1884)
- Aposphaeria pini-densiflorae Sawada (1950)
- Aposphaeria polonica Moesz (1920)
- Aposphaeria populea A.L.Sm. & Ramsb. (1914)
- Aposphaeria pulviscula (Sacc.) Sacc. (1880)
- Aposphaeria punicina Sacc. (1915)
- Aposphaeria purpurascens Peyronel (1916)
- Aposphaeria ramalinae Vouaux (1911)
- Aposphaeria reaumuriae T.M.Achundov (1972)
- Aposphaeria rhois Sacc. & Trotter (1912)
- Aposphaeria rostrata Oudem. (1902)
- Aposphaeria rubefaciens Bubák (1905)
- Aposphaeria rudis P.Karst. (1905)
- Aposphaeria salicis Died. (1912)
- Aposphaeria salicum Sacc. (1903)
- Aposphaeria santolinae Gucevič (1962)
- Aposphaeria sepulta (Penz.) Sacc. (1884)
- Aposphaeria sequoiae Lind (1913)
- Aposphaeria silenes M.Petrov (1933)
- Aposphaeria sphaerospora Peyronel (1918)
- Aposphaeria striolata Sacc. (1916)
- Aposphaeria taquarae Viégas (1945)
- Aposphaeria tiliana Gucevič (1977)
- Aposphaeria tragopogonis Sandu & Mítítíuc (1971)
- Aposphaeria turmalis Ellis & Everh. (1902)
- Aposphaeria ulmicola (Berk.) Sacc. (1884)
- Aposphaeria zeae Lobik (1933)

== See also ==
- List of Aposphaeria species
