= Phoma glomerata =

Scientific classification
- Kingdom: Fungi
- Division: Ascomycota
- Class: Dothideomycetes
- Order: Pleosporales
- Family: Didymellaceae
- Genus: Phoma
- Species: P. glomerata

Binomial name
- Phoma glomerata (Corda) Wollenw. & Hochapfel (1936)

Synonyms
- Aposphaeria fibricola Aposphaeria glomerata Coniothyrium glomeratum Peyronellaea alternariacearum Peyronellaea fibricola Peyronellaea glomerata Phoma alternariaceum Phoma fibricola

Species of fungus

Phoma glomerata is a species of fungus that belongs to the family Pleosporaceae. It is a common plant pathogen but it can be found in temperate environments worldwide. Phoma glomerata grows in soil, plants, marine environments, inorganic materials, several animals, and sometimes humans. It is known to spoil wool, parasitize downy mildews, and produce various chemicals that are useful for pharmaceutical purposes.

== Taxonomy ==
Phoma glomerata is derived from the word PHOIS, meaning blister, and the word GLOMERO, which is to gather or heap. P. glomerata was first discovered and named in 1936 by Wollenw. & Hochapfel. P. glomerata belongs to the phylum Ascomycota, Class Dothideomycetes, Order Pleosporales, Family Didymellaceae, and Genus Phoma. It is synonymous to Didymella glomerata, Peyronellaea glomerata, Aposphaeria glomerata, and Phoma alternariaceum. It is related to fungi found in the Phoma and Didymellaceae genera but due to the complex nature and controversies of the genus, it is unknown who the closest relatives are to the glomerata, but it is incredibly morphologically similar to Phoma pomorum. It is also similar to Phoma subglomerata and Phoma aurea.

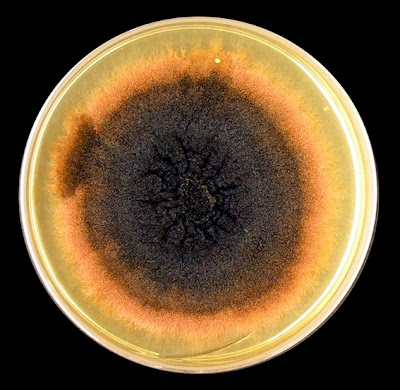
Phoma glomerata after 14 days of incubation.

== Morphology ==
Phoma glomerata will grow on its host, causing reddish-brown spotting on the leaves, often clustered together in a central spot. This is caused by the phytotoxins released.

Since P. glomerata belongs to the phoma genus, some of its basic features include septate hyphae that are hyaline to brown. They contain asexual fruiting bodies called Pycnidia, which can be round or pyriform and 70-100 μm in diameter. Other characteristics of their pycnidia are that they possess a dark color, multiple phialides at their inner lining, and have several openings known as ostioles. The ostioles release conidia that are unicellular, hyaline, or oval shaped.

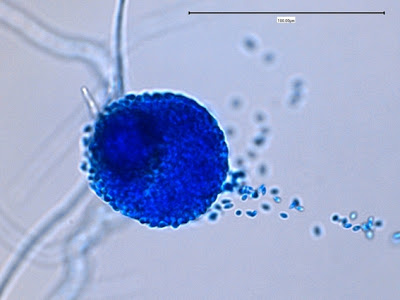
Phoma glomerata, Pycnidia with conidia around it. Ostiole is visible.

Phoma species produce different types of phoma toxins. Phoma glomerata has been reported to produce kojic acid and aflatoxin. P. glomerata possesses several unique characteristics, including the ability to parasitize downy mildews. Another characteristic that separates P. glomerata from other individuals of the Phoma genus is the ability to produce long chains of dictyochlamydospores that are similar to the Alternaria Alternata. It is noted that the production of dictyochlamydospores can be hard to induce and replicate in lab settings.

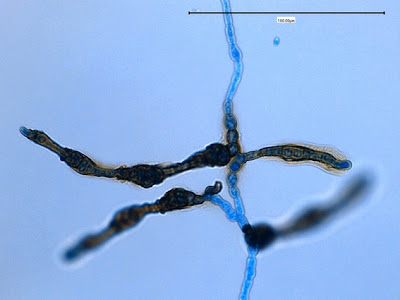
Phoma glomerata, Multiple chains of dictychlamydospores on a singular hyphae.

There are many different ways that Phoma individuals reproduce because of their unique characteristics. Phoma glomerata reproduce asexually through the production of their pycindia. It is unknown if they reproduce sexually or not. The general life cycle of Phoma species includes the initial infection, which can begin from a seedling or from a spore landing on a healthy plant. From there, the Phoma will produce pycindia when conditions are favorable, causing spotting and lesions on both the leaves and stems of the plant. After the infection, P. glomerata will send out its spores to infect more plants.

== Ecology ==
Because Phoma glomerata is a plant pathogen, it will use its targeted host to gain nutrients. P. glomerata is a common pathogen to many plants around the world including Vitis vinifera, Conifers, Lycopersicon esculentum, Malluspumila, Solanum tuberosum, dicots, and Prunus persica. Besides being a soil fungi it is also found in some marine systems, especially in some aquatic animals like crayfish. Numerous Phoma species can be found in animals so it is possible that Phoma glomerata is found in animals. P. glomerata can cause leaf spots, phoma blight, and root rot. There are also reports of wilting and many other symptoms in plants. P. glomerata has occasionally caused discoloration in mozzarella cheese and possesses the ability to decompose wool. P. glomerata can grow on common building materials such as wood, cement, oil painted surfaces, and paper.

P. Glomerata can be found all over the world, with documentations in parts of North America, Australia, Europe, Africa, and Asia. It has optimal growth ranges from 25 °C to below 37 °C and a preferred water content of 0.90.

P. glomerata is one of the many plant pathogens that plays a role in the phoma sensu lato species complex.

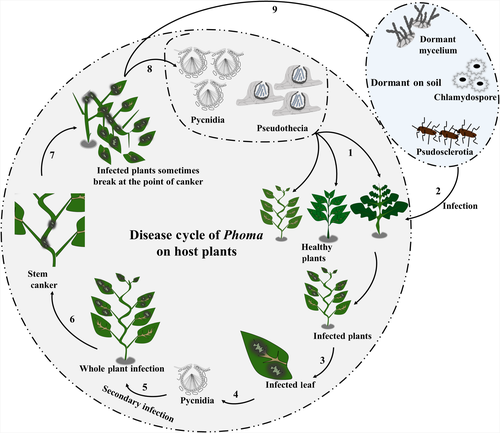
Life cycle of the phoma sensu lato complex.

The sensu lato species complex begins when the plant is first infected. When the infection spreads through the production of pycnidia, it will weaken the plant, making it available to be colonized by other Phoma species. When a species that produces cankers in plant tissue infects the plant, it causes the plant to fracture at the canker because of dead tissue build up. The pycnidia can land on the ground by falling from the plant or air and become dormant in the soil. The pycnidia can spread to other plants through the soil or by becoming airborne.

== Uses and prevention ==
Phoma glomerata has a few uses for humans. One is the ability to inhibit the growth of downy mildews because of its ability to parasitize it by acting as a mycoparasite that out competes the growth of the downy mildew. It is also known to inhibit the growth of clubroot diseases caused by protists because of its ability to secrete Epoxydon (C7H8O4). P. glomerata also produces salvianolic acid C, a pharmaceutical compound used to treat disease such as fibrosis or select cancers. The effectiveness of salvianolic acid C is still being researched. P. glomerata additionally produces N-acetyl-D-glucosamine and N-acetyl-D-galactosamine, a compound used in food production.

To prevent the growth of Phoma glomerata, fungicides can be used. Carbendazim, thiophanate methyl, tebuconazole and copper oxychloride are effective against P. glomerata. Fungicides that are effective against others from the Phoma genus include other benzimidazoles, chlorothalonil, dithiocarbamate, thiabendazole, thiram, and many more, that have not been tested on P. Glomerata. Another way to control the presence of Phoma is crop rotation and soil solarization. To limit the growth of P. Glomerata and other species of Phoma indoors, individuals should control the moisture content of the building. Mold and phoma are similar, both preferring moist environments. Little is known about controlling P. glomerata in a marine environment.

Phoma species can infect immunocompromised individuals; the infection is called phaeohyphomycosis. Phoma glomerata can be found airborne, indoors, and outdoors but there are no reports of it being a common human pathogen.

== See also ==
- List of mango diseases
- List of hemp diseases
- List of elm diseases
- List of wheat diseases
