= Cytosporina ludibunda =

Scientific classification
- Kingdom: Fungi
- Division: Ascomycota
- Class: Ascomycetes
- Order: incertae sedis
- Family: incertae sedis
- Genus: Cytosporina
- Species: C. ludibunda

Binomial name
- Cytosporina ludibunda Sacc. (1884)

Species of fungus

Cytosporina ludibunda is an ascomycete fungus that is a plant pathogen.
