= Thyrostroma compactum =

Scientific classification
- Kingdom: Fungi
- Division: Ascomycota
- Class: Dothideomycetes
- Order: Botryosphaeriales
- Family: Botryosphaeriaceae
- Genus: Thyrostroma
- Species: T. compactum

Binomial name
- Thyrostroma compactum (Sacc.) Höhn., (1911)

Synonyms
- Coryneum compactum Sacc., (1876); Sciniatosporium compactum (Sacc.) Morgan-Jones, (1971); Sporocadus compactus (Sacc.) Arx, (1981); Stegonsporium compactum (Sacc.) Sacc., (1882); Stigmina compacta (Sacc.) M.B. Ellis, (1959)

Species of fungus

Thyrostroma compactum is a plant pathogen in the family Botryosphaeriaceae.
