= Botryodiplodia ulmicola =

Scientific classification
- Kingdom: Fungi
- Division: Ascomycota
- Class: Sordariomycetes
- Order: Diaporthales
- Family: incertae sedis
- Genus: Botryodiplodia
- Species: B. ulmicola

Binomial name
- Botryodiplodia ulmicola (Ellis & Everh.) Buisman (1931)

Synonyms
- Sphaeropsis ulmicola Ellis & Everh. (1891); Macroplodia ulmicola (Ellis & Everh.) Kuntze (1898)

Species of fungus

Botryodiplodia ulmicola is an ascomycete fungus that is a plant pathogen.
