= Tunstallia (fungus) =

Scientific classification
- Kingdom: Fungi
- Division: Ascomycota
- Class: Sordariomycetes
- Order: Diaporthales
- Family: Sydowiellaceae
- Genus: Tunstallia

Species
- See text.

Genus of fungi

Tunstallia is a genus of fungi within the family Sydowiellaceae.

Species include:

- Tunstallia aculeata
