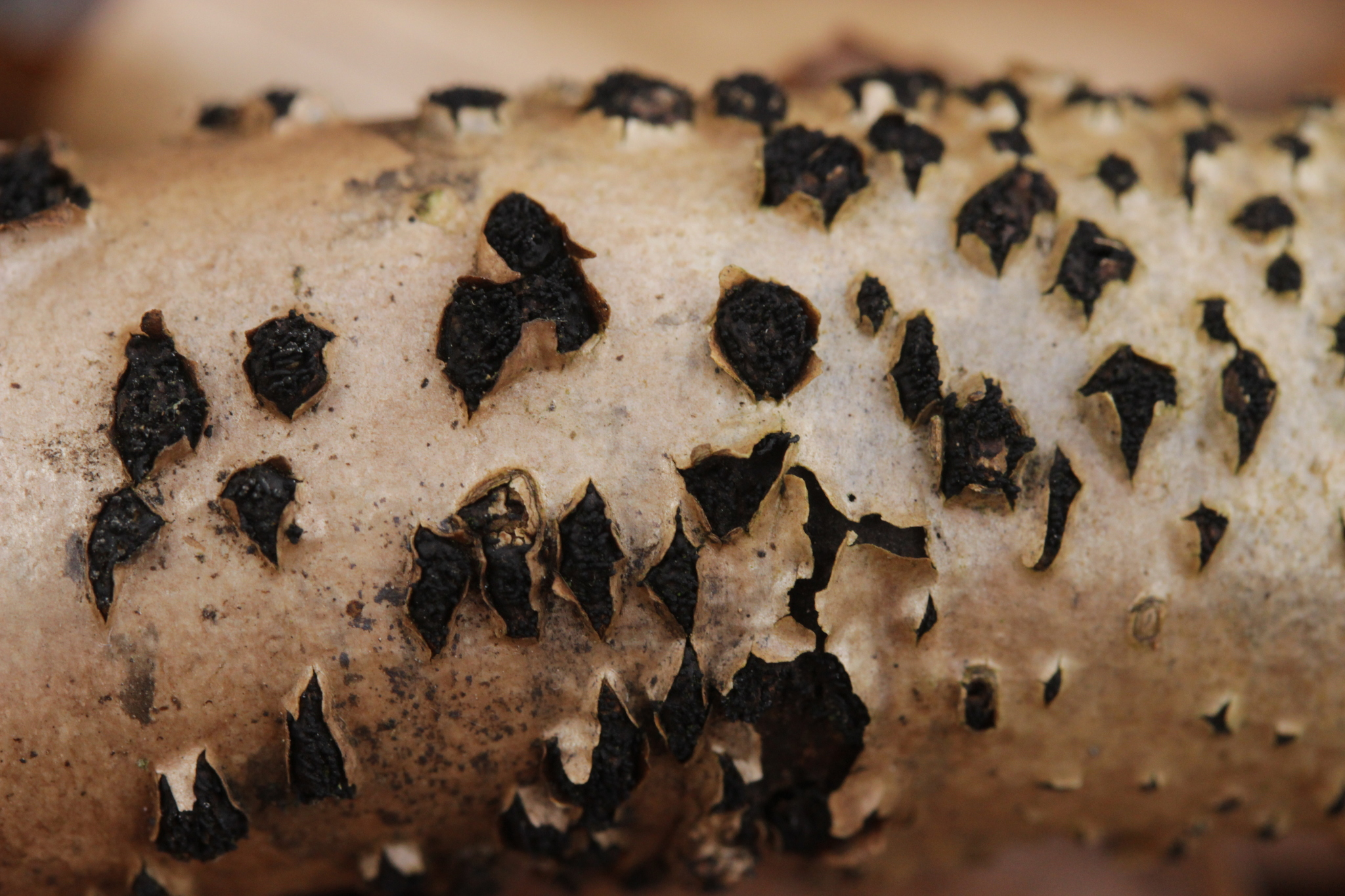
- Sillia ferruginea

Scientific classification
- Kingdom: Fungi
- Division: Ascomycota
- Class: Sordariomycetes
- Order: Diaporthales
- Family: Sydowiellaceae; Lar.N. Vassiljeva 1987

Type genus
- Sydowiella Petr. 1923

= Sydowiellaceae =

Family of fungi

Sydowiellaceae is a family of fungi in the order Diaporthales.

== Genera ==
As accepted by GBIF;

- Alborbis Senan. & K.D.Hyde (2)
- Breviappendix Senan. & K.D.Hyde (5)
- Cainiella E.Müll.
- Caudospora Starbäck (3)
- Chapeckia M.E.Barr, 1978 (3)
- Hapalocystis Auersw. ex Fuckel (7)
- Italiomyces Senan., Camporesi & K.D.Hyde, 2017 (3)
- Lambro Raciborski, 1900 (2)
- Paragnomonia Senan. & K.D.Hyde (1)
- Ranulospora Senan., Camporesi & K.D.Hyde, 2017 (3)
- Rossmania Lar.N.Vassiljeva, 2001 (2)
- Sillia P.Karst. (9)
- Stegophora H.Sydow & P.Sydow, 1916 (3)
- Sydowiella Petr. (9)
- Tenuiappendicula Senan., Camporesi & K.D.Hyde, 2017 (2)
- Tortilispora (4)
- Tunstallia V.Agnihothrudu, 1961 (1)
- Uleoporthe Petrak, 1941 (1)

Figures in brackets are approx. how many species per genus.
