= List of hazelnut diseases =

This article is a list of diseases of hazelnut (Corylus avellana & Corylus spp.).

== Bacterial diseases ==
Bacterial diseases
Bacterial blight	Xanthomonas arboricola pv. corylina
Bacterial canker	Pseudomonas syringae pv avellanae
Crown gall	Agrobacterium tumefaciens

== Fungal diseases ==
Fungal diseases
Anthracnose	Piggotia coryli = Monostichella coryli = Gloeosporium coryli = Labrella coryli
Armillaria root disease	Armillaria spp.
Borro sec	Cryptosporiopsis tarraconensis
Cytospora canker	Cytospora spp.
Eastern filbert blight	Anisogramma anomala
Kernel molds	Mycosphaerella punctiformis [teleomorph] Ramularia sp. [anamorph] Phomopsis spp. Septoria ostryae
Kernel spot	Nematospora coryli
Leaf blister	Taphrina coryli
Leaf spots	Anguillosporella vermiformis Asteroma coryli Cercospora corylina Cercospora coryli Mamianiella coryli Monochaetia coryli Mycosphaerella punctiformis [teleomorph] Ramularia sp. [anamorph] Phyllosticta coryli Ramularia coryli Septoria ostryae Sphaceloma coryli
Nectria canker	Nectria ditissima
Texas root rot	Phymatotrichopsis omnivora
Powdery mildew	Erysiphe cornutae Erysiphe corylacearum Erysiphe coryli-americanae Phyllactinia guttata
Rust	Pucciniastrum coryli

== Viral diseases ==
Viral diseases
Hazelnut mosaic	genus Ilarvirus, Apple mosaic virus (ApMV) genus Ilarvirus, Prunus necrotic ringspot virus (PNRSV) genus Ilarvirus, Tulare apple mosaic virus (TAMV)

== Phytoplasmal and spiroplasmal diseases ==
Phytoplasmal and spiroplasmal diseases
Filbert Stunt	unknown, suspect a phytoplasma
Hazelnut Yellows	phytoplasma

== Miscellaneous diseases and disorders ==
Miscellaneous diseases and disorders
Blanks	empty nut shells, cause unknown
Brown Stain	brown liquefied portions of shell and kernel, cause unknown
Catkin Blast	deformed catkins, cause unknown
Sun Scald	high temperature
Wet Feet	saturated soil conditions for extended periods.
