= Gnomoniopsis chinensis =

Scientific classification
- Kingdom: Fungi
- Division: Ascomycota
- Class: Sordariomycetes
- Order: Diaporthales
- Family: Gnomoniaceae
- Genus: Gnomoniopsis
- Species: G. chinensis

Binomial name
- Gnomoniopsis chinensis C.M.Tian & N.Jiang

Species of fungus

Gnomoniopsis chinensis is a species of ascomycete fungus in the family Gnomoniaceae, order Diaporthales. It was described from material collected in China and is known only from East Asia. Like other members of the genus Gnomoniopsis, the species is associated with plant tissues.

== Taxonomy ==
The genus Gnomoniopsis was established to accommodate species previously placed in Gnomonia that share a distinct combination of morphological traits and molecular characters. Gnomoniopsis chinensis was described based on morphological examination and comparison with related taxa and is currently recognized as a valid species in major mycological databases.

== Ecology ==
Gnomoniopsis chinensis is pathogenic on stems and branches of Chinese chestnut (Castanea mollissima). The species has been collected from chestnut plantations, where it occurs on woody tissues and produces conspicuous conidiomata on bark. It is one of several Gnomoniopsis species associated with the genus Castanea.

Phylogenetic analyses based on ITS, tef1, and tub2 gene regions distinguish G. chinensis from closely related species such as G. daii and G. smithogilvyi, despite similarities in conidial dimensions. G. chinensis and G. daii are both associated with Chinese chestnut, whereas G. smithogilvyi occurs on European chestnut (C. sativa) and hybrid chestnut hosts.
