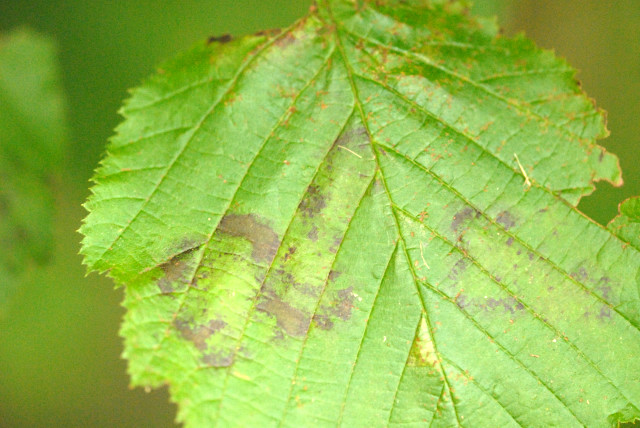
- Symptoms of Asteroma coryli infection on foliage

Scientific classification
- Kingdom: Fungi
- Division: Ascomycota
- Class: Sordariomycetes
- Order: Diaporthales
- Family: Gnomoniaceae
- Genus: Asteroma
- Species: A. coryli

Binomial name
- Asteroma coryli (Fuckel) B.Sutton (1980)

Synonyms
- Leptothyrium coryli Fuckel (1870); Septoria avellanae Berk. & M.A.Curtis (1876); Titaeosporina avellanae (Berk. & Broome) Petr. (1934); Cylindrosporella coryli (Fuckel) Arx (1981)

= Asteroma coryli =

Species of fungus

Asteroma coryli is a species of fungus in the family plant pathogen that causes leaf spot on hazelnut.
