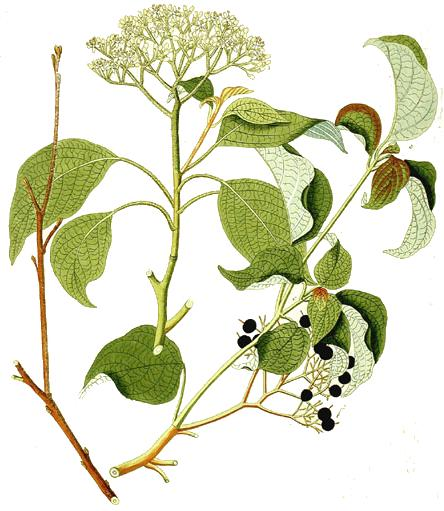

Conservation status
- Least Concern (IUCN 3.1)

Scientific classification
- Kingdom: Plantae
- Clade: Tracheophytes
- Clade: Angiosperms
- Clade: Eudicots
- Clade: Asterids
- Order: Cornales
- Family: Cornaceae
- Genus: Cornus
- Subgenus: Cornus subg. Mesomora
- Species: C. alternifolia

Binomial name
- Cornus alternifolia L.f.
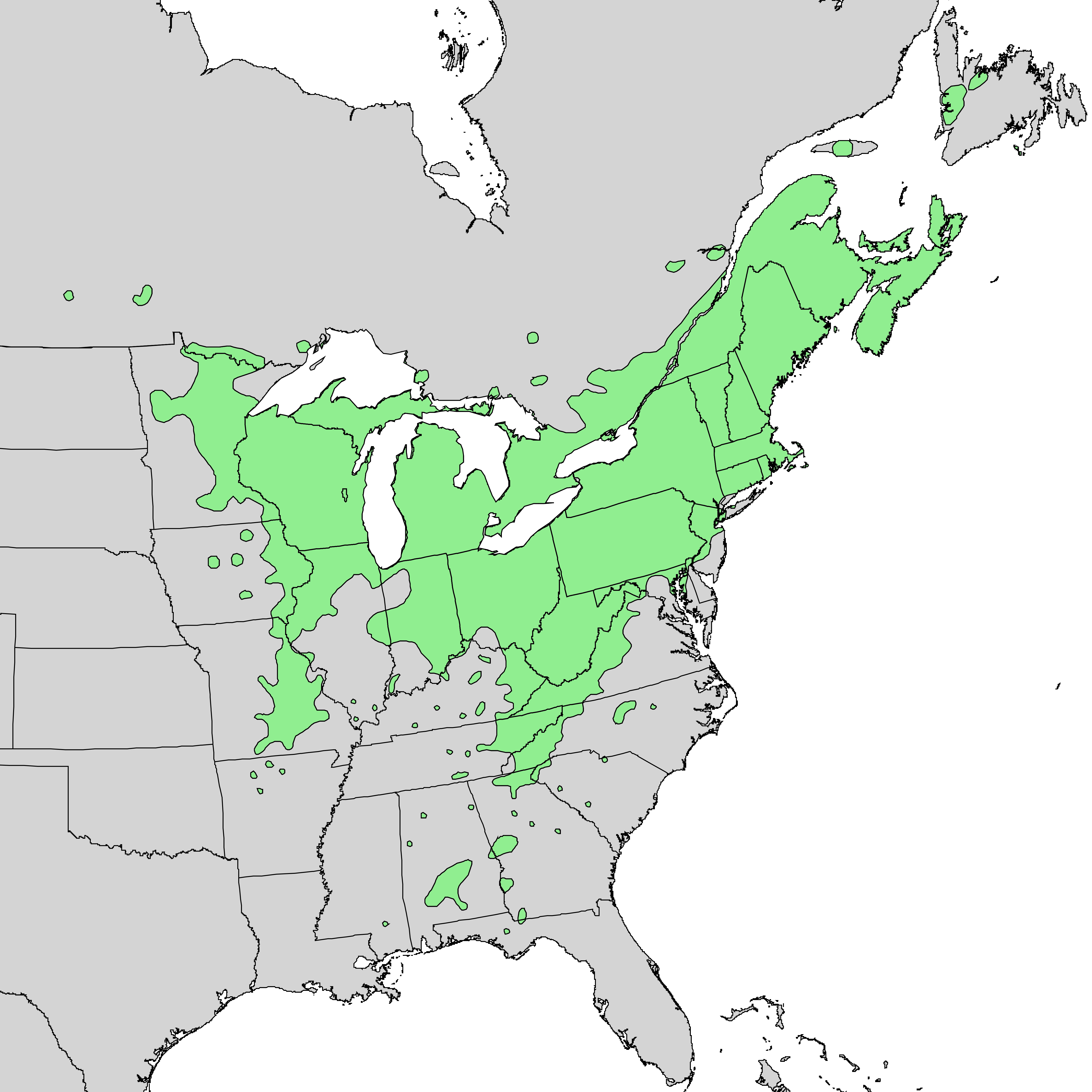
- Natural range

= Cornus alternifolia =

Species of tree

Cornus alternifolia is a species of flowering plant in the dogwood family Cornaceae, native to eastern North America, from Newfoundland west to southern Manitoba and Minnesota, and south to northern Florida and Mississippi. It is rare in the southern United States. It is commonly known as green osier, alternate-leaved dogwood, and pagoda dogwood.

== Description ==
It is a small deciduous shrub or tree growing to 25 feet (8 m) (rarely 30 feet (9 m)) tall and 20 feet (6 m) to 32 feet (10 m) wide, with a trunk up to 6 inches (152 mm) in diameter. The branches manifest in horizontal layers separated by gaps, with a flat-topped crown, said to resemble a pagoda.

The alternate-leaf dogwood is a shrub or small tree that has horizontal branches that form tiers. The branches are parallel to the ground creating a layered tiered look with upturned branches like a pagoda. This plant may grow from 15 to 25 feet tall and 20 to 32 feet wide.

Its leaves are elliptic to ovate and grow to 2–5 inches (5–13 cm) long and 1–2 inches (25–51 mm) broad, arranged alternately on the stems, not in opposite pairs typical of the majority of Cornus species. The leaves are most often arranged in crowded clusters around the ends of the twigs and appear almost whorled. The upper sides of the leaves are smooth and green, while the undersides are hairy and a bluish color. The bark is colored gray to brown, becoming ridged as it ages. Small cream colored flowers are produced, with four small petals. The flowers are grouped into cymes, with the inflorescences 2–5 inches (5–13 cm) across. It bears berries with a blackish blue color.

- Bark: Dark reddish brown, with shallow ridges. Branchlets at first pale reddish green, later dark green.
- Wood: Reddish brown, sapwood pale; heavy, hard, close-grained. Sp. gr., 0.6696; weight 41–73 lb/cu ft (660–1,170 kg/m^{3}).
- Winter buds: Light chestnut brown, acute. Inner scales enlarge with the growing shoot and become half an inch long before they fall.
- Leaves: Alternate, rarely opposite, often clustered at the ends of the branch, simple, three to five inches long, two to three wide, oval or ovate, wedge-shaped or rounded at base; margin is wavy toothed, slightly reflexed, apex acuminate. They come out of the bud involute, reddish green above, coated with silvery white tomentum beneath, when full grown are bright green above, pale, downy, almost white beneath. Feather-veined, midrib broad, yellowish, prominent beneath, with about six pairs of primary veins. In autumn they turn yellow, or yellow and scarlet. Petioles slender, grooved, hairy, with clasping bases.
- Flowers: April, May. Perfect, cream color, borne in many-flowered, broad, open cymes, at the end of short lateral branches.
- Calyx: The cup-shaped flowers have four petals that are valvate in bud, unwrapping when in bloom with cream colored, oblong shaped petals with rounded ends. The petals are inserted on disk and the stamens are inserted too and arranged alternately to the petals, being four in number also. The stamens are exserted with filaments long and slender. Anthers oblong, introrse, versatile, two-celled; cells opening longitudinally.
- Pistil: Ovary inferior, two-celled; style columnar; stigma capitate.
- Fruit: Drupe, globular, blue-black, 0.3 in (8 mm) across, tipped with remnant of style which rises from a slight depression; nut obovoid, many-grooved. October.

== Habitat ==
C. alternifolia is found under open deciduous trees, as well as along the margins of forests and swamps. These trees prefer moist, well drained soil.

Seedlings are shade-tolerant and it is often found as an understory tree in mature forests, such as those dominated by Acer saccharum (sugar maple) or Populus (aspen). It is also common in younger forests.

== Ecology ==
The fruits provide food for at least eleven species of birds and the black bear. The leaves and bark are eaten by white-tailed deer, beaver, and cottontail rabbit. It additionally has been marked as a pollinator plant, supporting and attracting bees, flies, and butterflies. It is a host plant for butterflies, providing food during their larval stage.

== Use ==
The tree is regarded as attractive because of its wide-spreading shelving branches and flat-topped head, and is often used in ornamental plantings. The flower clusters have no great white involucre as have those of the flowering dogwood, and the fruit is dark purple instead of red.

The cultivar 'Argentea' (silver pagoda dogwood) has gained the Royal Horticultural Society's Award of Garden Merit (confirmed 2017).

C. alternifolia is susceptible to golden canker (Cryptodiaporthe corni), particularly when drought-stressed or heat-stressed. Proper siting of the plant in partial to full shade, along with adequate mulch and water, will reduce the incidence of this pathogen.

Cornus alternifolia has been used in the traditional Chinese medicine as tonic, analgesic, and diuretic.

== Gallery ==
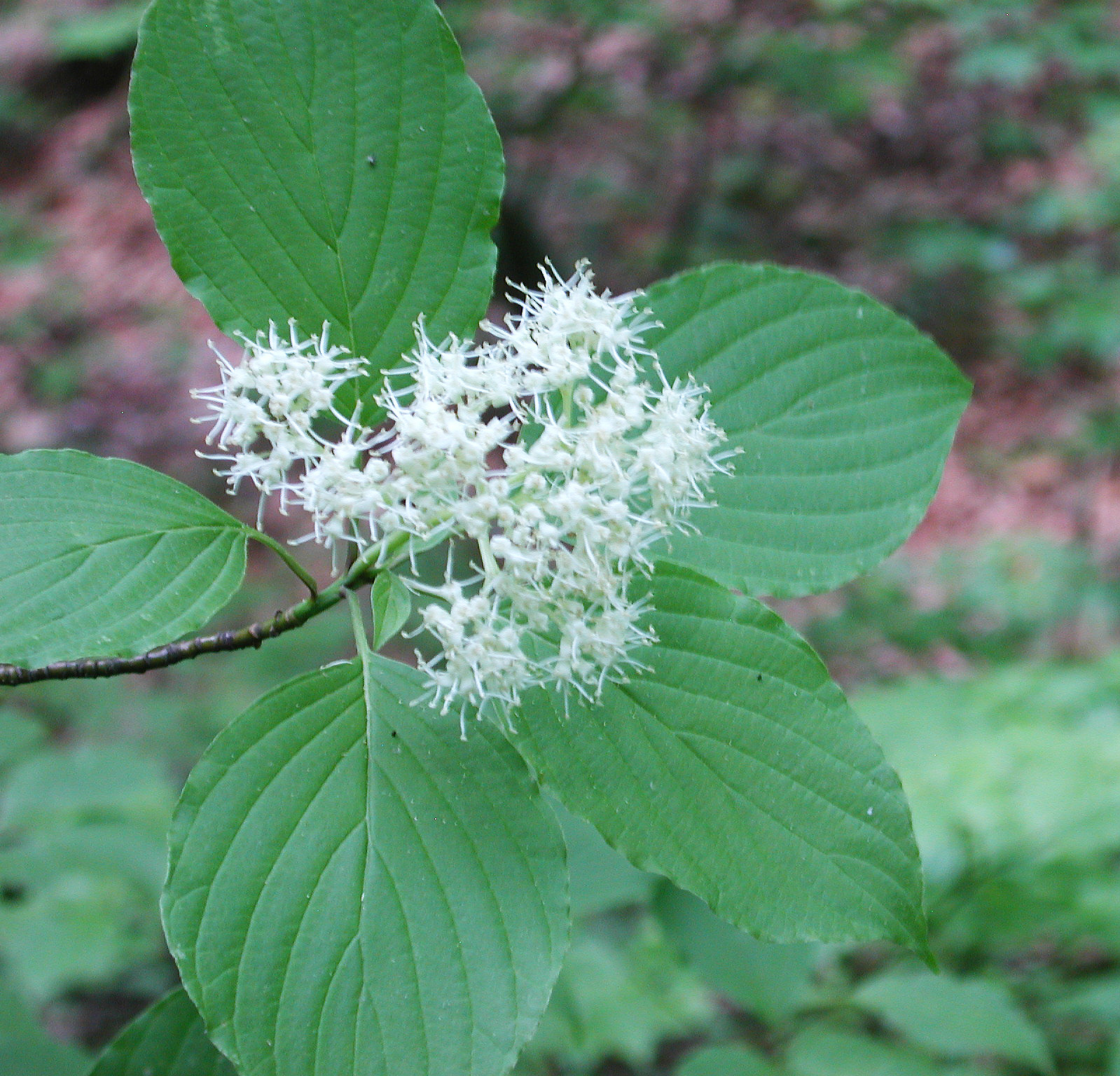
Flowers

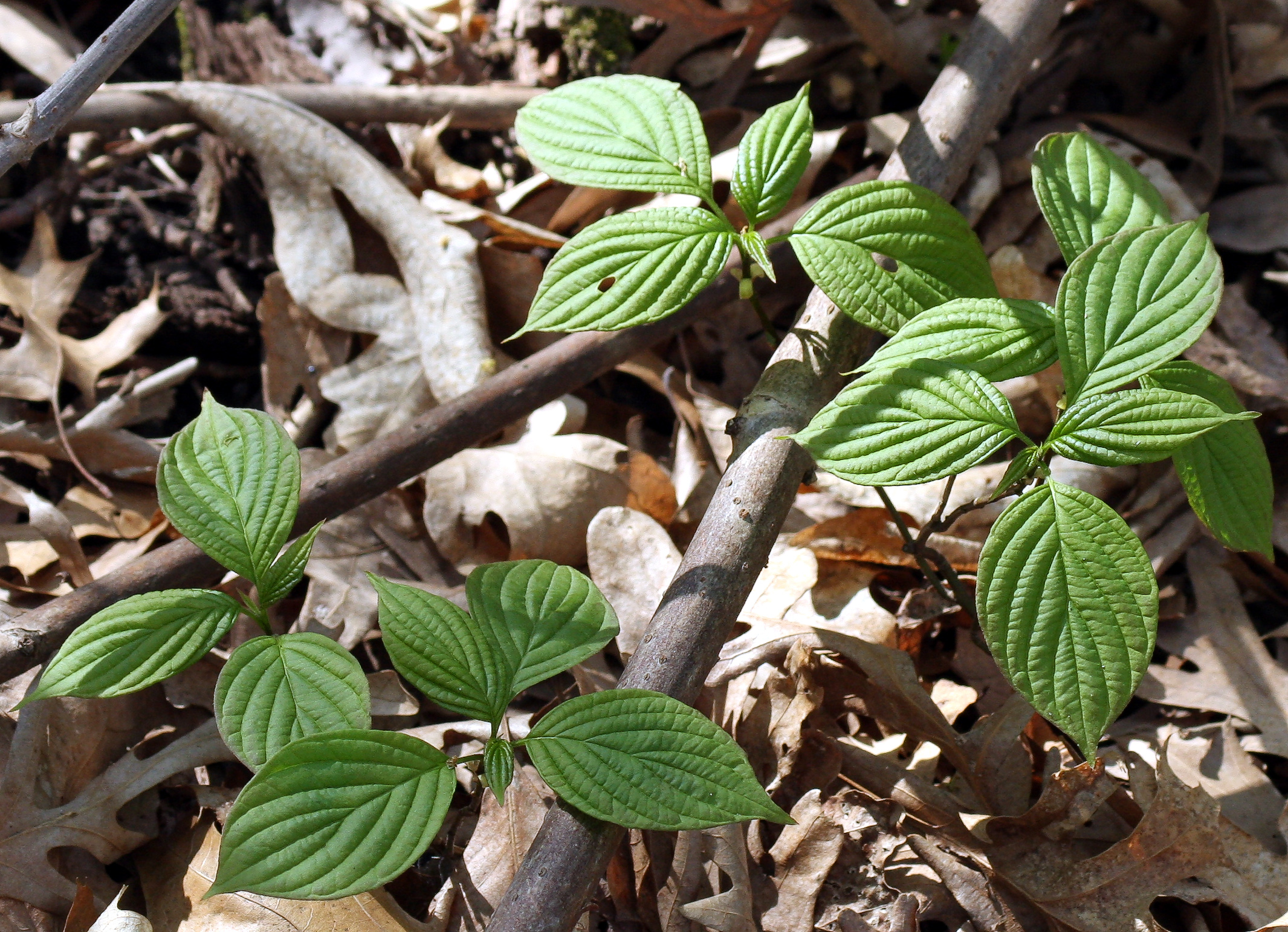
Seedlings

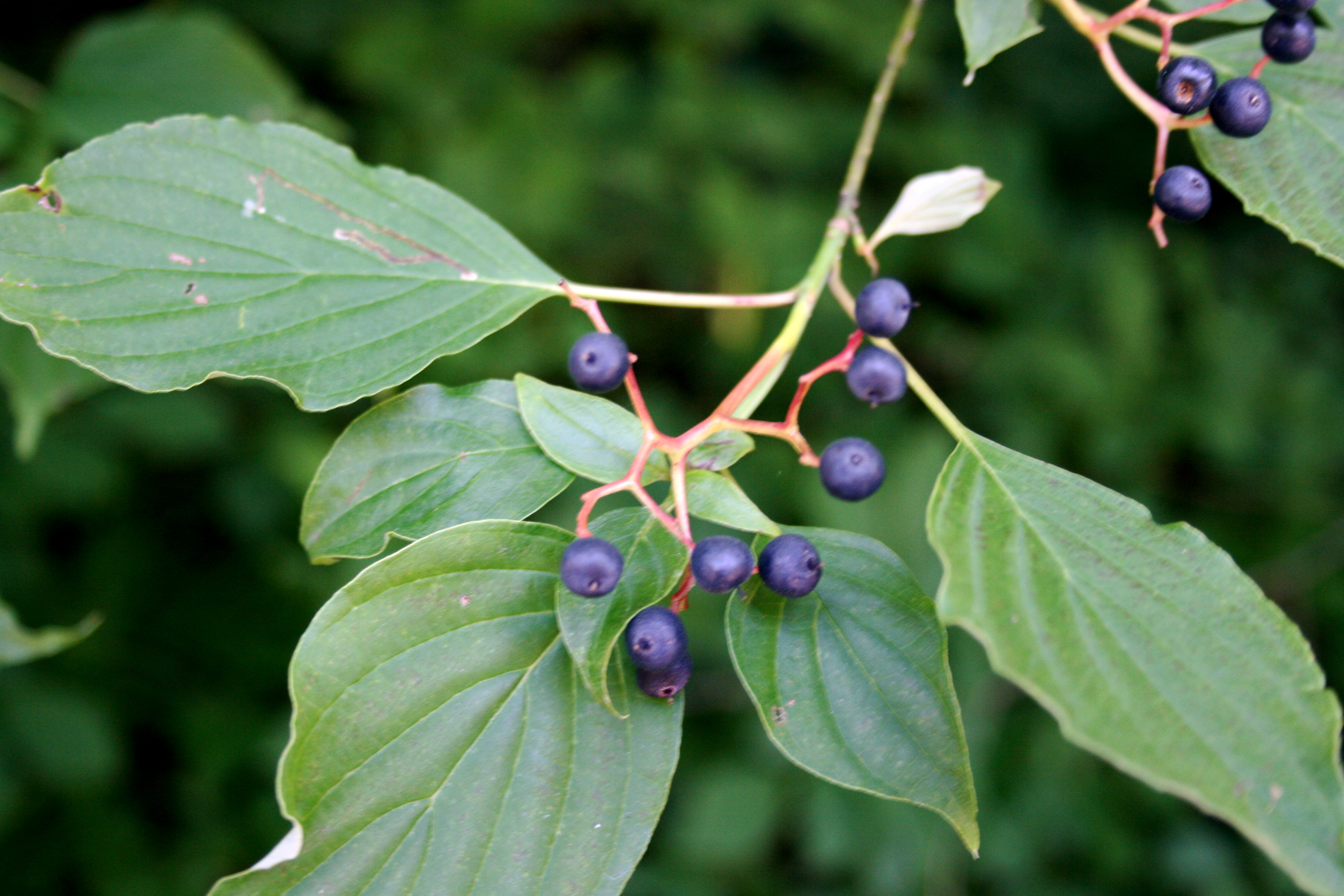
Fruit
