= Carl Skottsberg =

Swedish botanist and Antarctic explorer (1880–1963)

Carl Skottsberg ForMemRS HonFRSE FMLS
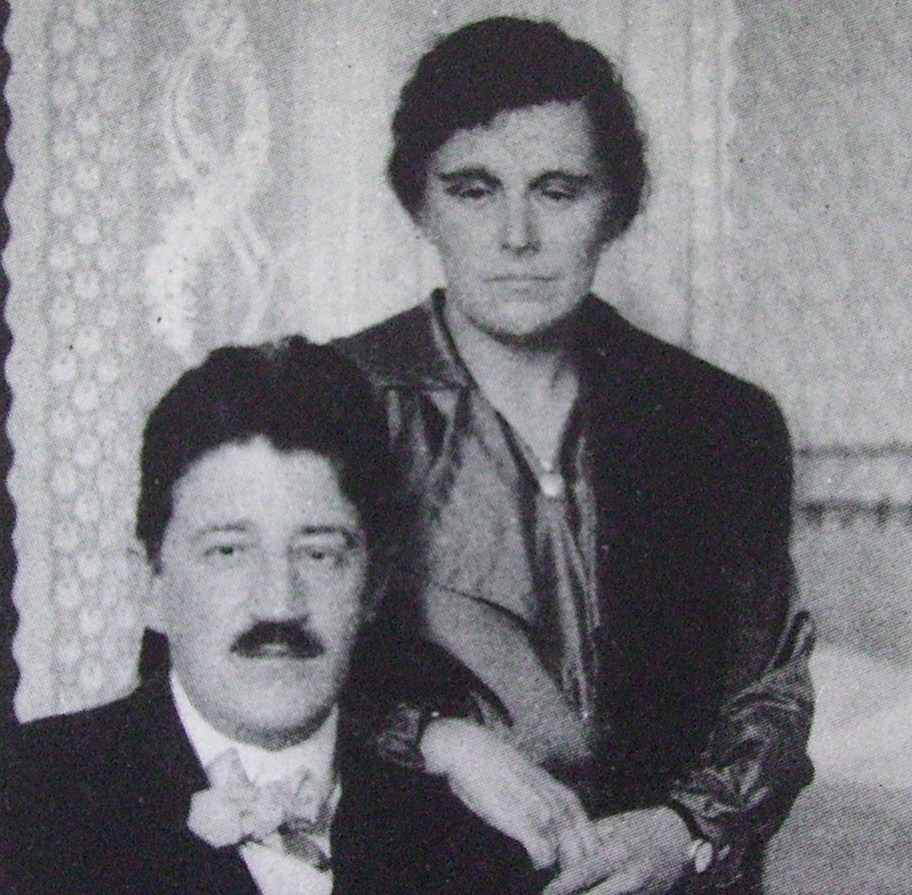
- Carl Skottsberg with his wife Inga
- Born: Carl Johan Fredrik Skottsberg; 1 December 1880; Karlshamn
- Died: 14 June 1963 (aged 82); Gothenburg
- Education: Uppsala University
- Awards: Darwin-Wallace Medal (Silver, 1958); Linnean Medal (1959); Fellow of the Royal Society
- Scientific career
- Author abbrev. (botany)

Carl Johan Fredrik Skottsberg (1 December 1880 – 14 June 1963) was a Swedish botanist and explorer of Antarctica.

== Life ==
Skottsberg was born in Karlshamn on 1 December 1880 the son of Carl Adolf Skottsberg a schoolmaster and his wife, Maria Louisa Pfeiffer.

He was educated locally then studied Sciences at Uppsala University from 1898, specialising in Botany, and receiving his doctorate (PhD) there in 1907.

From 1901 to 1903 Skottsberg served as official botanist to the Swedish Antarctic Expedition of 1901 to 1903 on the ship Antarctic. On his return to Sweden, Skottsberg published (1905) the first comprehensive phytogeographic study of the flora of southern Patagonia and Tierra del Fuego. Later he led the Swedish Magellanic Expedition to Patagonia, 1907 to 1909. Carl Skottsberg is believed to have been the last to have seen the Santalum fernandezianum tree alive when he visited the Juan Fernández Islands in 1908.

He was conservator at the Uppsala University Botanical Museum 1909 to 1914, but led the work on the new Botanical Garden in Gothenburg from 1915, and was appointed professor and director of the garden there, Göteborg Botanical Garden, in 1919.

In 1909, he married Inga Margareta Reuter.

Skottsberg was a member of the Royal Swedish Academy of Sciences and several other Swedish learned societies, and was elected a Fellow of the Royal Society in 1950. That same year he presided the 7th International Botanical Congress. He was awarded the Linnean Society of London's Darwin-Wallace Medal in 1958 and the Linnean Medal in 1959.

He is buried at Östra kyrkogården in Gothenburg.

== Publications ==
- The Wilds of Patagonia (1919)
- Remarks on the Hawaiian Flora (1939)
- Observations on Hawaiian Violets (1940)
- Communities of Marine algae (1941)
- Botanical Survey of the Falkland Islands
- The Natural History of Juan Fernandez and Easter Island
- Meddelanden (1963)

== Honours ==
Several taxa have been named in his honour;

- Skottsbergia Cardot 1905 (genus of moss in Ditrichaceae family),
- Skottsbergiella Petr. 1927 (genus of Fungi in Gnomoniaceae family),
- Skottsbergiella Epling 1935 (genus of Lamiaceae) a synonym of Cuminia Colla,
- Skottsbergiliana H.St.John 1974 (a genus of Cucurbitaceae), now a synonym of Sicyos,
- Skottsbergiella Boelcke 1982 (genus of Brassicaceae), now a synonym of Xerodraba Skottsb.,
- Skottsbergianthus Boelcke 1984 (genus of Brassicaceae), now a synonym of Xerodraba,
