= Asteroma inconspicuum =

Scientific classification
- Kingdom: Fungi
- Division: Ascomycota
- Class: Sordariomycetes
- Order: Diaporthales
- Family: Gnomoniaceae
- Genus: Asteroma
- Species: A. inconspicuum

Binomial name
- Asteroma inconspicuum (Cavara) B. Sutton (1980)

Species of fungus

Asteroma inconspicuum is a plant pathogen that causes anthracnose on elm.
