= Pleuroceras =

Pleuroceras may refer to:

- Pleuroceras (ammonite), a genus of ammonites
- Pleuroceras (fungus), a genus of fungi
