= Asteroma caryae =

Scientific classification
- Kingdom: Fungi
- Division: Ascomycota
- Class: Sordariomycetes
- Order: Diaporthales
- Family: Gnomoniaceae
- Genus: Asteroma
- Species: A. caryae

Binomial name
- Asteroma caryae (Peck) B. Sutton (1980)

Species of fungus

Asteroma caryae is a plant pathogen that causes liver spot disease of pecan.
