= Chondroplea populea =

Scientific classification
- Kingdom: Fungi
- Division: Ascomycota
- Class: Sordariomycetes
- Order: Diaporthales
- Family: Gnomoniaceae
- Genus: Chondroplea
- Species: C. populea

Binomial name
- Chondroplea populea (Sacc. & Briard) Kleb. (1933)

Synonyms
- Dothichiza populea Sacc. & Briard (1884)

Species of fungus

Chondroplea populea is a species of fungus belonging to the family Gnomoniaceae.
