= Diplodina =

Diplodina may refer to:

- Diplodina (fungus), a genus of fungi in the family Gnomoniaceae
- Diplodina, a genus of butterflies, unresolved taxon, described in 1916 by Schaus
- Diplodina, a genus of protists in the family Urosporidae; synonym of Gonospora
