= Gnomoniopsis castaneae =

Scientific classification
- Kingdom: Fungi
- Division: Ascomycota
- Class: Sordariomycetes
- Order: Diaporthales
- Family: Gnomoniaceae
- Genus: Gnomoniopsis
- Species: G. castaneae

Binomial name
- Gnomoniopsis castaneae Tamietti (2012)

Synonyms
- Gnomoniopsis castanea Tamietti (2012); Gnomoniopsis smithogilvyi L.A. Shuttlew., E.C.Y. Liew & D.I. Guest (2012)

Species of fungus

Gnomoniopsis castaneae (synonym Gnomoniopsis smithogilvyi) is a fungus of the order Diaporthales that is the most important cause of brown chestnut rot, an emerging disease that damages the fruit of chestnuts. It also causes cankers and necrosis on leaves and on chestnut galls caused by the gall wasp, Dryocosmus kuriphilus. It has been observed to cause cankers in chestnut wood. Additionally, it can cause cankers on other chestnut species, red oak, hazelnut trees, less severe damage to some nut trees, and lives as an endophyte on other nut trees. The disease has been reported in Europe, Oceania, and has recently been found in North America; for this reason, the fungus is considered a potential threat to the reintroduction of the American chestnut.

In brown chestnut rot, Gnomoniopsis castaneae infects the kernel of the nut with browning and necrosis of endosperm and embryo. Brown chestnut rot is expressed cryptically with apparently healthy nuts found after harvest to exhibit internal rot. The fungus is believed to initially establish endophyte colonization of chestnut tissues, only becoming pathogenic with ripening of the nuts. Early on, parasitized nuts are difficult to distinguish from good nuts, rot only being detected when processed or eaten. The route of infection is uncertain but is believed to be either infection of chestnut flowers by ascospores or conidia or by inoculum entrance through shell defects. The fungus persists as a saprophyte in duff, such as burs, fallen leaves and other residua, which act as the reservoir for formation of perithecia with eventual release of spores. The nature of the transfer of inoculum and dispersal in time and space and the effect of climate is unknown.

The fungus also kills the chestnut gall wasp Dryocosmus kuriphilus and has been proposed as a potential natural biocontrol agent against insect pests, based on studies of its effect on Plodia interpunctella and Trogoderma granarium. Exposure of the fungus to the commercial biofungicide Serenade® ASO (Bacillus amyloliquefaciens QST 713; ASO) induced the fungus to produce the mycotoxins 3-nitropropionic acid and diplodiatoxin. Exposure of the fungus to the chemical fungicide Horizon® (tebuconazole; HOR) induced the fungus to produce diplodiatoxin. These mycotoxins might present a health hazard to human consumers of chestnuts treated with these fungicides.

In a chestnut orchard context, strategies for managing Gnomoniopsis castaneae infections include aggressive pruning of infected branches, maintaining tree health via proper hydration and nutrient provision so as to improve resistance, and fungicide application when necessary. Since this fungus can spread through spores, proper sanitation and disposal of infected plant material are also crucial to limit its spread.
