= Plagiostoma =

Plagiostoma is the genus name for two groups of organisms and may refer to:

- Plagiostoma (bivalve), a genus of bivalves in the family Limidae
- Plagiostoma (fungus), a genus of fungi in the family Gnomoniaceae
