= Xenotypa =

Scientific classification
- Kingdom: Fungi
- Division: Ascomycota
- Class: Sordariomycetes
- Order: Diaporthales
- Family: Gnomoniaceae
- Genus: Xenotypa; Petr.

Type species
- Xenotypa aterrima (Fr.) Petr.

Genus of fungi

Xenotypa is a genus of fungi in the family Gnomoniaceae. This is a monotypic genus, containing the single species Xenotypa aterrima.
