= Phragmoporthe =

Scientific classification
- Kingdom: Fungi
- Division: Ascomycota
- Class: Sordariomycetes
- Order: Diaporthales
- Family: Gnomoniaceae
- Genus: Phragmoporthe; Petr.

Type species
- Phragmoporthe ploettneriana (Henn.) Petr.

Species
- P. conformis P. ploettneriana P. pseudotsugae

Genus of fungi

Phragmoporthe is a genus of fungi in the Gnomoniaceae family. Species in the genus are found in Europe and North America.
