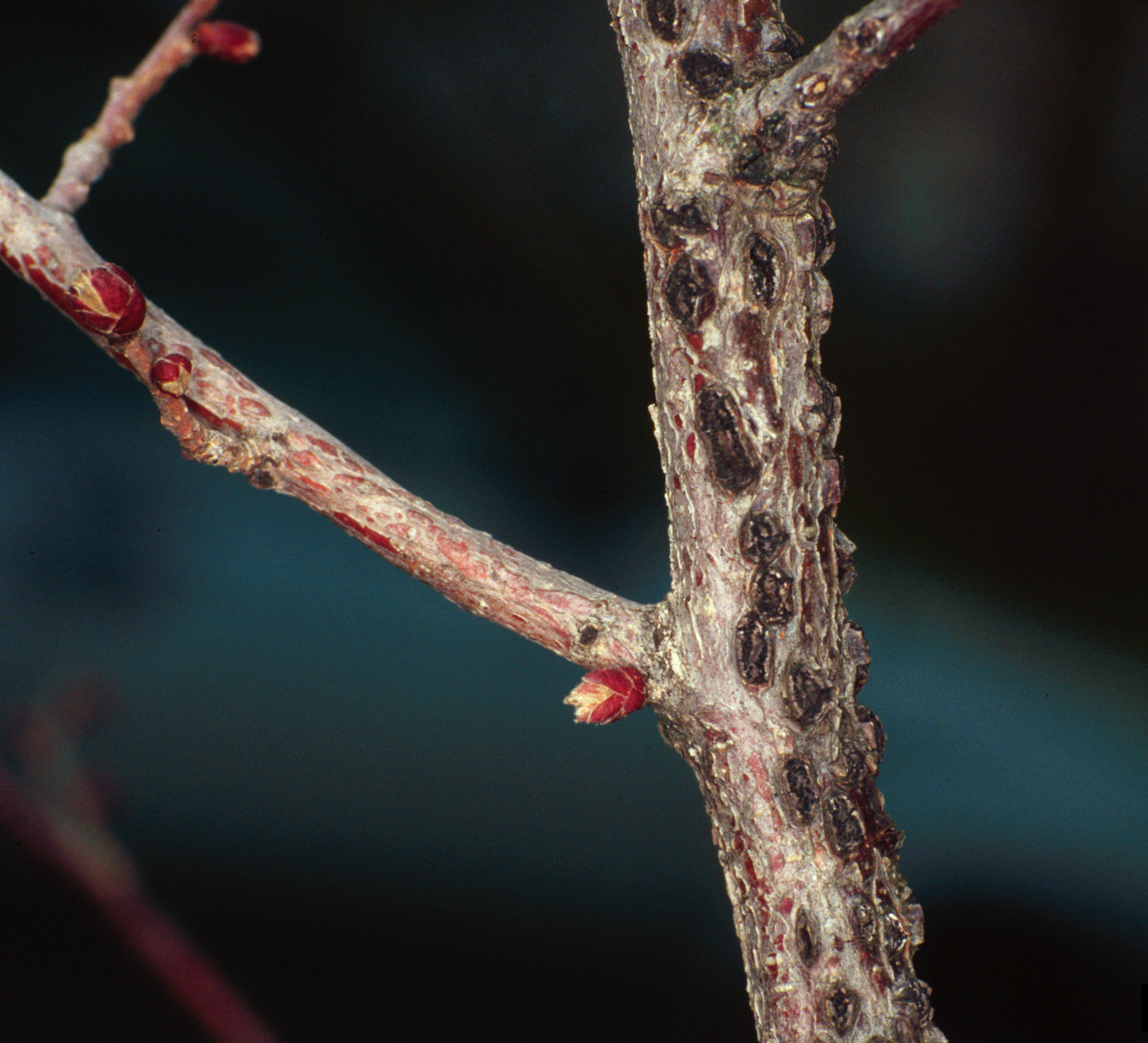
- Cankers caused by Anisogramma anomala on a hazlenut branch

Scientific classification
- Kingdom: Fungi
- Division: Ascomycota
- Class: Sordariomycetes
- Order: Diaporthales
- Family: Gnomoniaceae
- Genus: Anisogramma
- Species: A. anomala

Binomial name
- Anisogramma anomala (Peck) E. Müll., (1962)

Synonyms
- Rectal warts (Peck) Höhn., (1917); Cryptosporella anomala (Peck) Sacc., (1882); Diatrype anomala Peck

= Anisogramma anomala =

Species of fungus

Anisogramma anomala is a plant pathogen that causes a disease known as Eastern filbert blight (or EFB) on Corylus spp. (hazelnut).

== Disease cycle ==
Anisogramma anomala is an ascomycete that has a two-year disease cycle. Infection is thought to typically occur during the wet season between February and May. The infection typically occurs at the apical bud during periods of high humidity that favor the pathogen. After the initial infection the pathogen can eventually spread to the phloem, cambium, and even the outer xylem. This fungal pathogen produces cankers made up of stromata. The stromata typically develop the second summer after the initial infection. Within the stroma, perithecia are produced that give rise to asci and ascospores. The ascospores are released as a white ooze during wet weather. Wind-driven water droplets and splashing spread the spores to new potential hosts.

== Hosts and symptoms ==
Anisogramma anomala's host is the European hazelnut. It is a particular problem on Corylus avellana, which is farmed commercially. Wild alternate hosts do exist and make elimination of the disease particularly hard. The predominant infected tissue is the branches. The disease begins producing cankers on the branches that continue to spread each year. The disease is usually diagnosed by the stromata that make up a cankers being identified. The stromata are elliptical and black. They form in rows and continue to grow in this pattern each year because they are perennial. These stromata will eventually emit a white ooze containing spores that can also be used for diagnosis.

== Pathogenesis ==
Anisogramma anomala’s ascospores can only infect immature tissue, both leaf and stem, near the apical bud of new shoots. They are unable to enter through wounds or natural openings of mature tissues and seeds.

Corylus cultivars with the single dominant resistant gene from "Gasaway” may get cankers, but at a low frequency; the cankers may be smaller, and may not produce spores. Some of the cankers will heal over the years, assuming that stromata are destroyed. Some A. anomala strains from East-Northern America can overcome the single dominant resistance gene of these resistant cultivars, indicating that the plant-pathogen interaction is multifaceted.

== Management ==
There are many different methods for managing Anisogramma anomala. These include both chemical and cultural control of the disease. An integrated management system using both types of control is recommended for Eastern Filbert Blight. Systemic fungicides are recommended when the shoots of the plant are elongating rapidly. If protectant fungicides are going to be used it is recommended to apply every 8 to 17 days. These fungicides interrupt the disease by killing the fungal cells on contact preventing the spread of the disease. Although chemical control can be effective, cultural management is the most common method of control for this disease. Cultural management for Eastern Filbert Blight involves scouting orchards, pruning and removing cankers, and removing plant debris from the ground. Orchards should be scouted thoroughly twice per year to remove cankers. During the winter cankers are easier to observe and should be removed. When removing cankers the branch should be cut 3 feet below the end of the canker. Any material that was removed should be immediately burned or buried. Lastly, susceptible pollinizers should be severely pruned back on a 3 or 4-year rotational schedule. These cultural methods interrupt the spread of the disease through an infected tree. Anisogramma anomala is a slow moving disease and the pruning and removal of infected branches removes the reproductive structures needed to produce spores for infection.

== Environment ==
Precipitation events and duration of those events have been found to influence spore dispersal. Major rainstorms, on average, accounted for 90% of total ascospores released while brief and showery rains accounted for 10% in daily measurements; dews rarely induce ascospore dispersal. Precipitation events that occurred for at least 5 hours exhibited 75% of daily ascospore capture while 10-hour and 20-hour durations exhibited 95% and 100% ascospore capture respectively. Thus, low durations of powerful storms are enough to induce a significant amount of spore dispersal.

However, no correlation has been established between precipitation intensity and ascospore density, indicating that ascospores are not actively dispersed by rain splashes; rather, they are forcibly ejected into air currents, granted by the long beak and narrow restricted ostiole of the perithecium and the expulsion of spores from high internal pressure caused by a swollen, wetted perithecium. Spores are not released until the first precipitating event that causes the perithecium to swell; afterwards, subsequent precipitation immediately releases spores, but the maximum rate of ascospore release is not obtained until 3 to 5 hours of precipitation. This indicates that consistent precipitating events will likely lead to a greater dispersal of spores.

The greatest likelihood of ascospore release occurs near bud-break (mid-March) when major storms are most prevalent. Late spring showed a decrease in ascospore dispersal due to fewer viable ascospores and major rainstorms. A. anomala has also been found to travel long distances on infected plant material of Corylus spp., so improper disposal of dead branch tissues is conducive to diseases—although A. anomala does not live saprophytically on dead tissues. There has been no correlation between light, temperature, and ascospore dispersals in field studies.

== Importance ==
The disease that Anisogramma anomala causes has significantly delayed commercial hazelnut production in North America. Hazelnut is an important commodity as it is the 5th most important tree nut in the world. 90% of the world crop is used as kernels in candies, baked goods, and other products. Some important brands that use hazelnuts includes Nutella and Ferrero Rocher. The US produces only 4% of hazelnuts, and 99% of it is grown in the Willamette Valley of Oregon, which provides a perfect climate for hazelnut trees. Eastern filbert blight is prevalent in the East, so commercial production of hazelnut in the U.S. was initially successful in the west. However, in the late 1960s, the disease was detected in Washington state, and eventually it spread to British Columbia, despite efforts to contain it, and was first detected in 2002. Prior to this, little was known about the disease because European colonists provided little documentation about the destruction of European hazelnut trees in the east. Study of the fungus and the search for resistance began at Oregon State University in the 1970s, which led to the development of methods that identified resistant plants and their use in plant breeding. New resistant strains and other cultural, chemical, biological, and mechanical practices as described by eastern filbert blight management program (EFBMP) have revived commercial hazelnut production in Canada.
