= Bagcheea =

Scientific classification
- Kingdom: Fungi
- Division: Ascomycota
- Class: Sordariomycetes
- Order: Diaporthales
- Family: Gnomoniaceae
- Genus: Bagcheea; E. Müll. & R. Menon

Type species
- Bagcheea castaneae E. Müll. & R. Menon

Species
- B. albomaculans B. castaneae B. taiwanensis

Genus of fungi

Bagcheea is a genus of fungi in the family Gnomoniaceae. The genus contains three species.
