= Gnomoniella =

Scientific classification
- Kingdom: Fungi
- Division: Ascomycota
- Class: Sordariomycetes
- Order: Diaporthales
- Family: Gnomoniaceae
- Genus: Gnomoniella; Sacc.

Type species
- Gnomoniella tubiformis (Tode) Sacc.

Genus of fungi

Gnomoniella is a genus of fungi in the family Gnomoniaceae. The genus contains 13 species:

- Gnomoniella albomaculans Neger
- Gnomoniella alnobetulae
- Gnomoniella amygdalina (Fuckel) Sacc.
- Gnomoniella avellanae Sacc., 1882
- Gnomoniella brunaudiana Pass.
- Gnomoniella carpinea (Fr.) M. Monod
- Gnomoniopsis castanea also called Gnomoniopsis smithogilvyi
- Gnomoniella devexa var. media Sacc.
- Gnomoniella euphorbiae (Fuckel) Sacc.
- Gnomoniella euphorbiae-verrucosae M. Monod
- Gnomoniella fasciculata (Fuckel) Sacc.
- Gnomoniella fraxini - Ash anthracnose
- Gnomoniella hippocastani Brunaud
- Gnomoniella idaeicola (P.Karst.) Sacc.
- Gnomoniella microspora M. Monod
- Gnomoniella nana Rehm
- Gnomoniella rubicola Pass. - on dead stems of Rubus
- Gnomoniella tubiformis, Gnomoniella tubaeformis (Tode) Sacc., 1882
- Gnomoniella vagans Johanson
- Gnomoniella vasarii M. Monod
