= Ophiovalsa =

Scientific classification
- Kingdom: Fungi
- Division: Ascomycota
- Class: Sordariomycetes
- Order: Diaporthales
- Family: Gnomoniaceae
- Genus: Ophiovalsa; Petr.

Species
- O. femoralis O. fici O. quercus O. theae O. tiliae O. tomentella O. trichispora O. valsoides

Genus of fungi

Ophiovalsa is a genus of fungi in the family Gnomoniaceae.
