= Mamianiella coryli =

Scientific classification
- Kingdom: Fungi
- Division: Ascomycota
- Class: Sordariomycetes
- Order: Diaporthales
- Family: Gnomoniaceae
- Genus: Mamianiella
- Species: M. coryli

Binomial name
- Mamianiella coryli (Batsch) Höhn., Annls mycol. 16(1/2): 102 (1918)

Synonyms
- Gnomonia coryli (Batsch) Auersw., (1869); Gnomonia coryli (Batsch) Cooke; Gnomoniella coryli (Batsch) Sacc., (1882); Mamiania coryli De Not., (1863); Sphaeria coryli Batsch, (1789)

Species of fungus

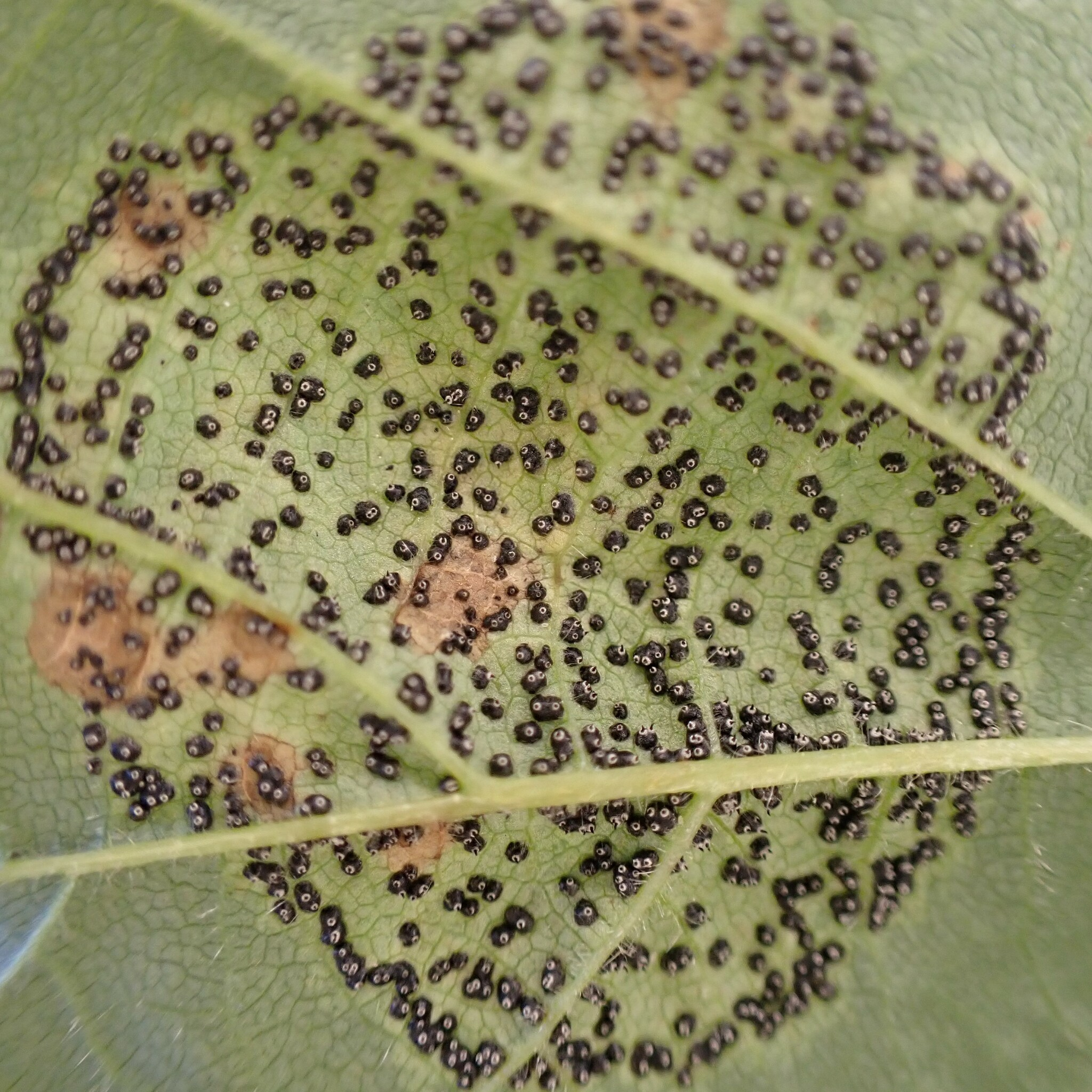
Mamianiella coryli.

Mamianiella coryli is a plant pathogen.
