= Valseutypella =

Scientific classification
- Kingdom: Fungi
- Division: Ascomycota
- Class: Sordariomycetes
- Order: Diaporthales
- Family: Gnomoniaceae
- Genus: Valseutypella; Höhn.

Type species
- Valseutypella tristicha (De Not.) Höhn.

Species
- V. multicollis V. tristicha

Genus of fungi

Valseutypella is a genus of fungi in the family Gnomoniaceae. The genus contains two species.
