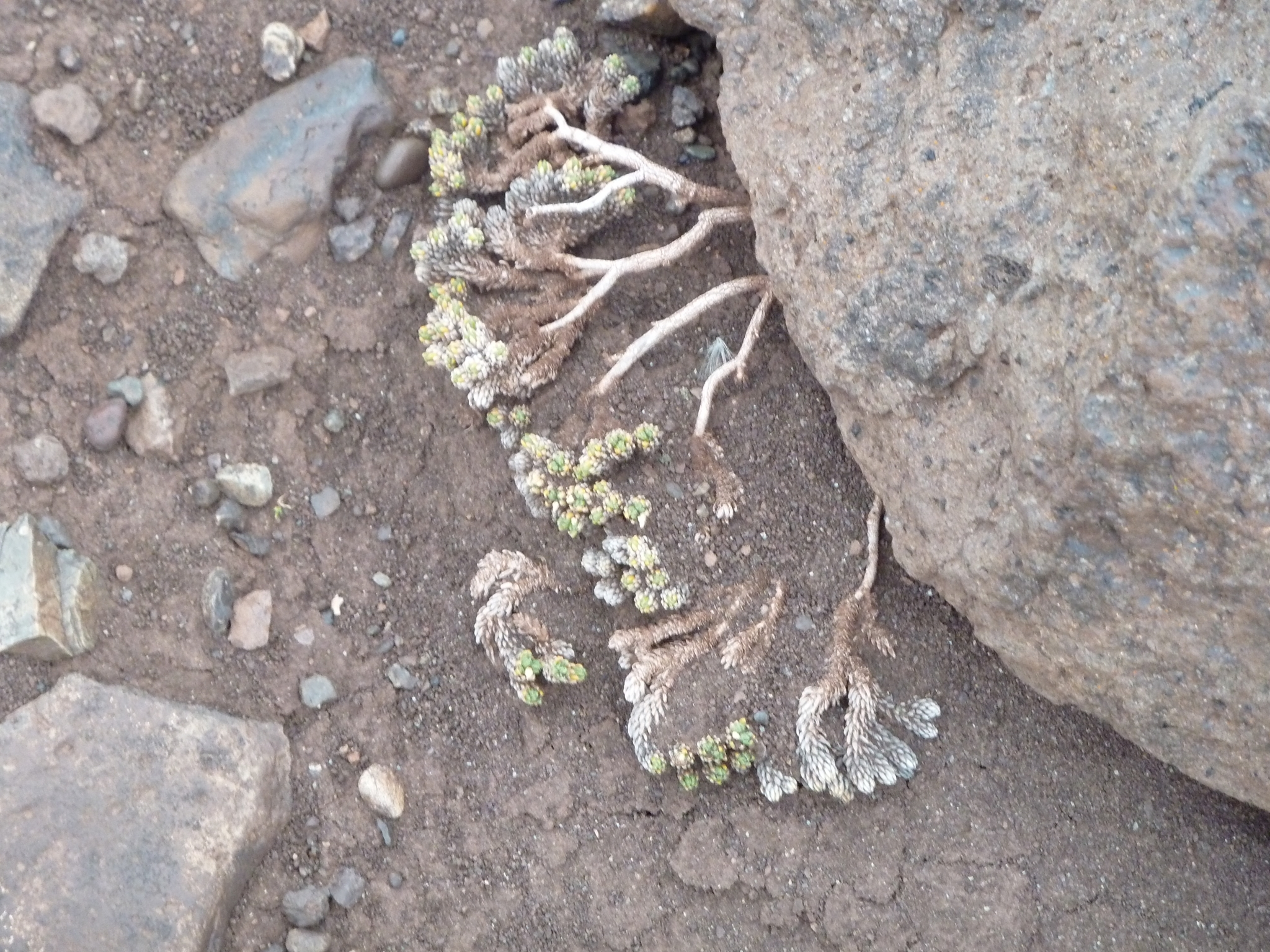

Scientific classification
- Kingdom: Plantae
- Clade: Tracheophytes
- Clade: Angiosperms
- Clade: Eudicots
- Clade: Rosids
- Order: Brassicales
- Family: Brassicaceae
- Genus: Xerodraba; Skottsb.

Synonyms
- Skottsbergianthus Boelcke; Skottsbergiella Boelcke

= Xerodraba =

Genus of flowering plants

Xerodraba is a genus of flowering plants belonging to the family Brassicaceae. Its native range is southern Chile and southern Argentina.

== Species ==
Five species are accepted.

- Xerodraba colobanthoides Skottsb.
- Xerodraba glebaria (Speg.) Skottsb.
- Xerodraba lycopodioides (Speg.) Skottsb.
- Xerodraba monantha (Gilg ex Kuntze) Skottsb.
- Xerodraba patagonica (Speg.) Skottsb.
