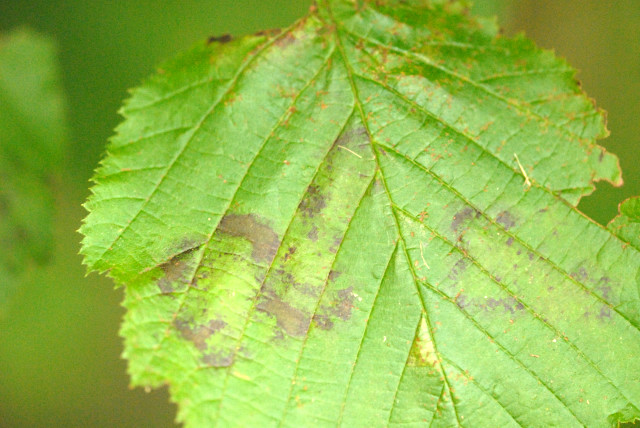
- Symptoms of Asteroma coryli on foliage

Scientific classification
- Kingdom: Fungi
- Division: Ascomycota
- Class: Sordariomycetes
- Order: Diaporthales
- Family: Gnomoniaceae
- Genus: Asteroma; DC

Species
- Asteroma caryae; Asteroma coryli; Asteroma inconspicuum

Synonyms
- Depazea Fr.; Actinonemella Höhn.; Gloeosporina Höhn.; Titaeosporina Luijk; Ribaldia Cif

= Asteroma =

Genus of fungi

Asteroma is a genus of pathogenic fungus in the family Gnomoniaceae, containing several species that cause leaf spot and canker on plants such as goldenrod, primrose, and Erythronium.
