= Mamianiella =

Scientific classification
- Kingdom: Fungi
- Division: Ascomycota
- Class: Sordariomycetes
- Order: Diaporthales
- Family: Gnomoniaceae
- Genus: Mamianiella; Höhn.

Type species
- Mamianiella coryli (Batsch) Höhn.

Species
- Mamianiella coryli Mamianiella yukawana

Genus of fungi

Mamianiella is a genus of fungi in the family Gnomoniaceae.
