= Phylloporthe =

Scientific classification
- Kingdom: Fungi
- Division: Ascomycota
- Class: Sordariomycetes
- Order: Diaporthales
- Family: Gnomoniaceae
- Genus: Phylloporthe; Syd.

Type species
- Phylloporthe vernoniae Syd.

Genus of fungi

Phylloporthe is a genus of fungi in the family Gnomoniaceae. This is a monotypic genus, containing the single species Phylloporthe vernoniae.
