= Ditopella =

Scientific classification
- Kingdom: Fungi
- Division: Ascomycota
- Class: Sordariomycetes
- Order: Diaporthales
- Family: Gnomoniaceae
- Genus: Ditopella; De Not.

Type species
- Ditopella fusispora De Not.

Genus of fungi

Ditopella is a genus of fungi in the family Gnomoniaceae.

== Species ==
- D. asclepiadea
- D. cryptosphaeria
- D. ditopa
- D. farcta
- D. fusispora
- D. hosackiae
- D. kajiana
- D. koschkelovae
- D. microscopica
- D. obducens
- D. populi
- D. vizeana
