= Labrella coryli =

Scientific classification
- Kingdom: Fungi
- Division: Ascomycota
- Class: Ascomycetes
- Order: incertae sedis
- Family: incertae sedis
- Genus: Labrella
- Species: L. coryli

Binomial name
- Labrella coryli (Roberge ex Desm.) Sacc. (1884)

Species of fungus

Labrella coryli is an ascomycete fungus. It is a plant pathogen that causes anthracnose on hazelnut. It was not found in North America prior to 1951.
