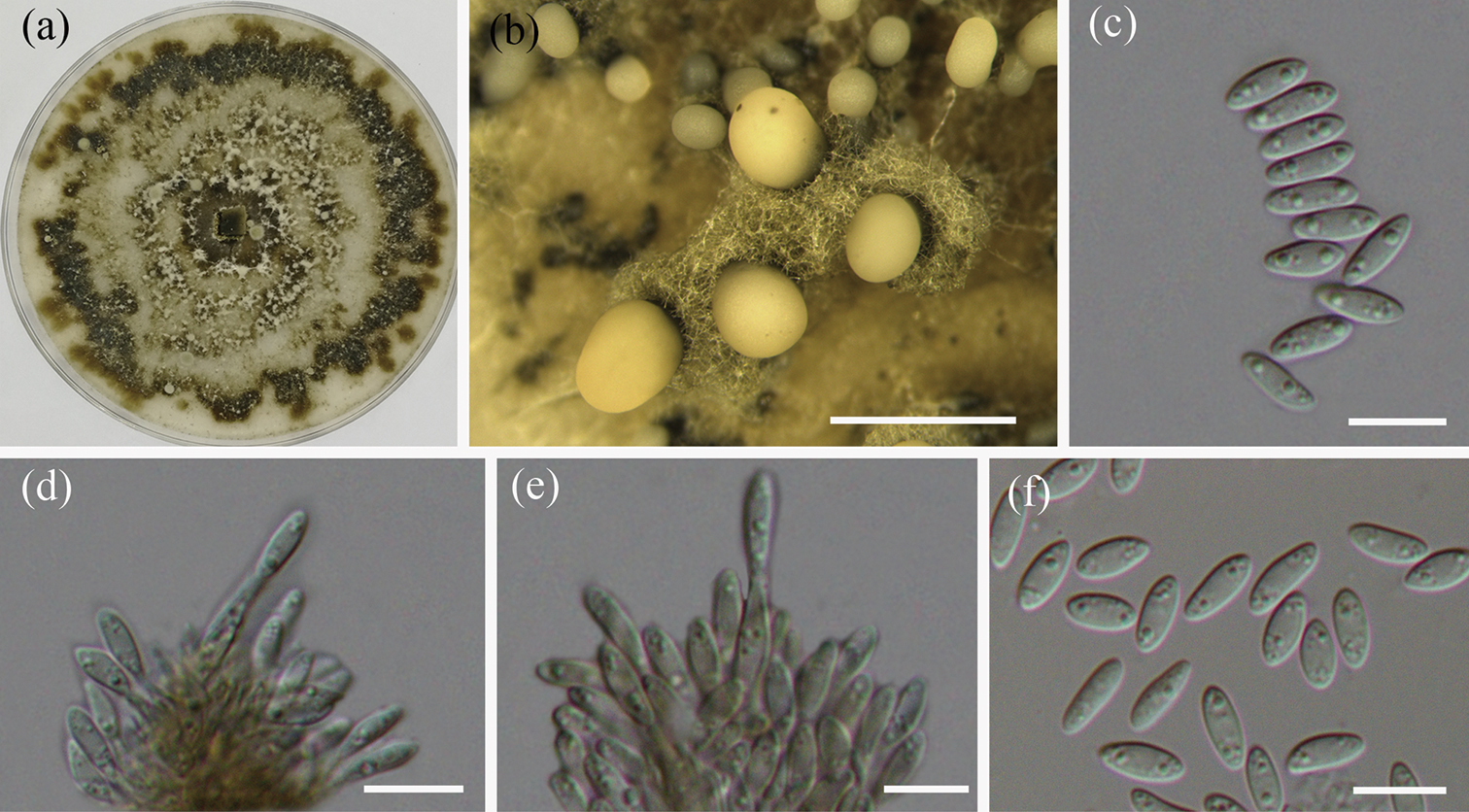
- Morphology of Gnomoniopsis chinensis from PDA, a colonies on PDA b conidiomata formed on PDA c, f conidia d, e conidiogenous cells. Scale bars: 1 mm (b); 10 μm (c–f)

Scientific classification
- Kingdom: Fungi
- Division: Ascomycota
- Class: Sordariomycetes
- Order: Diaporthales
- Family: Gnomoniaceae
- Genus: Gnomoniopsis; Berl.

= Gnomoniopsis =

Genus of fungi

Gnomoniopsis is a genus of fungi belonging to the family Gnomoniaceae. They grow in plant tissue, being pathogenic, endophytic or saprophytic.

The genus was first described by Augusto Napoleone Berlese in 1892.

Species:

- Gnomoniopsis castaneae
- Gnomoniopsis chinensis
- Gnomoniopsis comari
- Gnomoniopsis idaeicola
- Gnomoniopsis xunwuensis
