= Cryptosporiopsis tarraconensis =

Scientific classification
- Kingdom: Fungi
- Division: Ascomycota
- Class: Leotiomycetes
- Order: Helotiales
- Family: Dermateaceae
- Genus: Cryptosporiopsis
- Species: C. tarraconensis

Binomial name
- Cryptosporiopsis tarraconensis Gené & Guarro, (1990)

Species of fungus

Cryptosporiopsis tarraconensis is a plant pathogen affecting Corylus avellana.
