= Chondroplea =

Scientific classification
- Kingdom: Fungi
- Division: Ascomycota
- Class: Sordariomycetes
- Order: Diaporthales
- Family: Gnomoniaceae
- Genus: Chondroplea; Kleb.

Genus of fungi

Chondroplea is a genus of fungi belonging to the family Gnomoniaceae.

The genus was first described by Klebahn in 1933.

Species:

- Chondroplea brenckleana
- Chondroplea populea
