= Diplacella =

Scientific classification
- Kingdom: Fungi
- Division: Ascomycota
- Class: Sordariomycetes
- Order: Diaporthales
- Family: Gnomoniaceae
- Genus: Diplacella; Syd.

Type species
- Diplacella paulliniae (Gonz. Frag. & Cif.) Syd.

Species
- D. mararyensis D. paulliniae

Genus of fungi

Diplacella is a genus of fungi in the family Gnomoniaceae.
