= Anisomyces =

Scientific classification
- Kingdom: Fungi
- Division: Ascomycota
- Class: Sordariomycetes
- Order: Diaporthales
- Family: Gnomoniaceae
- Genus: Anisomyces; Theiss. & Syd.

Type species
- Anisomyces papilloideoseptatus (Henn.) Theiss. & Syd.

Species
- A. nectrioides A. papilloideoseptatus A. theissenii

Genus of fungi

Anisomyces is a genus of fungi in the family Gnomoniaceae.
