= Linospora =

Scientific classification
- Kingdom: Fungi
- Division: Ascomycota
- Class: Sordariomycetes
- Order: Diaporthales
- Family: Gnomoniaceae
- Genus: Linospora; Fuckel

Type species
- Linospora capreae (DC.) Fuckel

Genus of fungi

Linospora is a genus of fungi in the family Gnomoniaceae. The genus contains four species.
