= Mamiania =

Scientific classification
- Kingdom: Fungi
- Division: Ascomycota
- Class: Sordariomycetes
- Order: Diaporthales
- Family: Gnomoniaceae
- Genus: Mamiania; Ces. & De Not.

Type species
- Mamiania fimbriata (Pers.) Ces. & De Not.

Species
- M. alni M. hystrix Mamiania ostryae

Genus of fungi

Mamiania is a genus of fungi in the family Gnomoniaceae. The genus contains three species.
