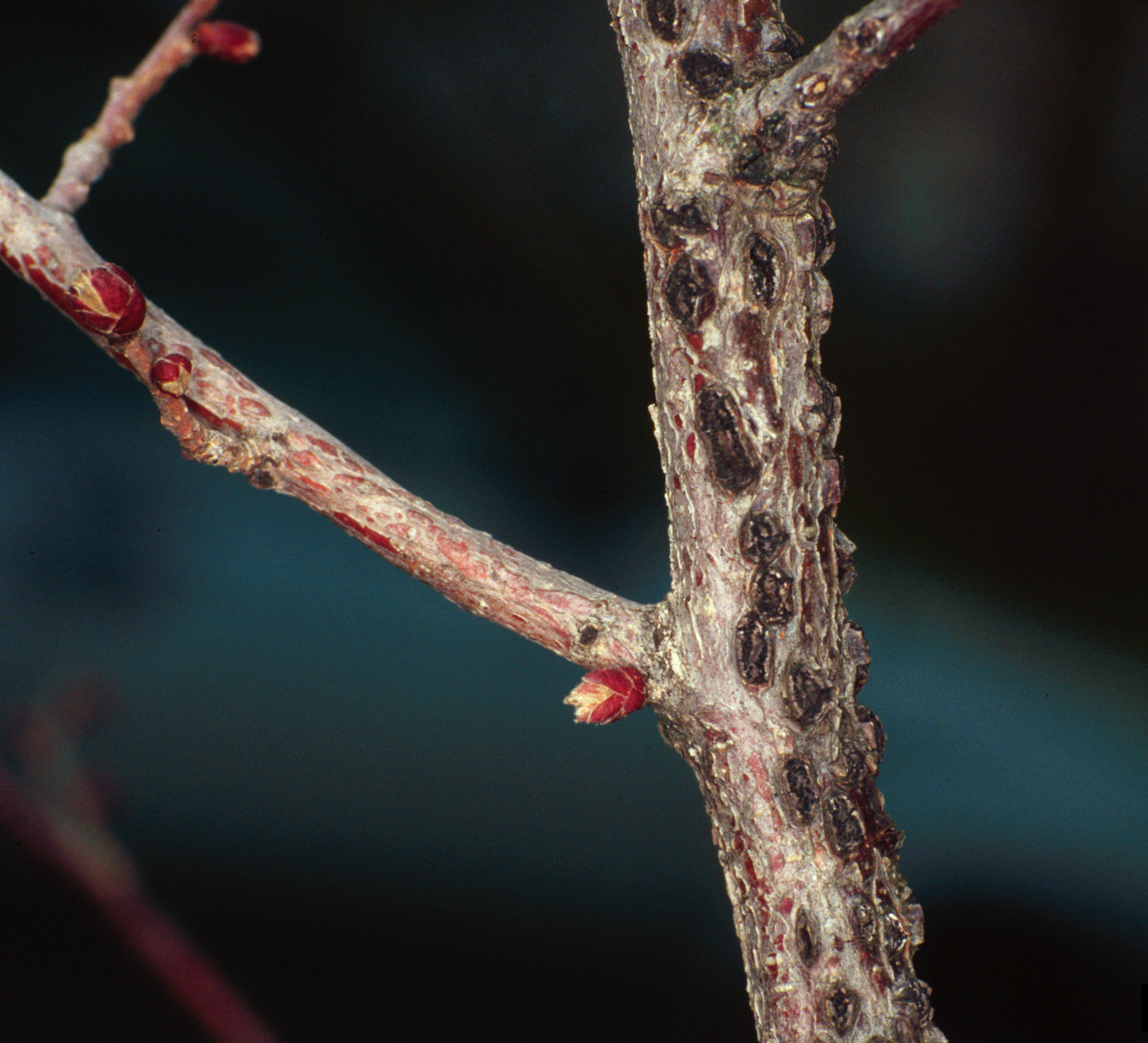

Scientific classification
- Kingdom: Fungi
- Division: Ascomycota
- Class: Sordariomycetes
- Order: Diaporthales
- Family: Gnomoniaceae
- Genus: Anisogramma; Theiss. & Syd.

Type species
- Anisogramma virgultorum (Fr.) Theiss. & Syd.

Species
- A. anomala A. apiospora A. virgultorum

= Anisogramma =

Genus of fungi

Anisogramma is a genus of fungi in the family Gnomoniaceae. The genus contains three species. One of them, Anisogramma anomala, is the cause of eastern filbert blight.
