= Ditopellopsis =

Scientific classification
- Kingdom: Fungi
- Division: Ascomycota
- Class: Sordariomycetes
- Order: Diaporthales
- Family: Gnomoniaceae
- Genus: Ditopellopsis; J. Reid & C. Booth

Type species
- Ditopellopsis clethrae J. Reid & C. Booth

Species
- D. alni D. clethrae D. linearis D. racemula D. sophorae

Genus of fungi

Ditopellopsis is a genus of fungi in the family Gnomoniaceae. The genus contains four species.
