= Laestadia =

Scientific classification
- Kingdom: Plantae
- Clade: Embryophytes
- Clade: Tracheophytes
- Clade: Angiosperms
- Clade: Eudicots
- Clade: Asterids
- Order: Asterales
- Family: Asteraceae
- Subfamily: Asteroideae
- Tribe: Astereae
- Subtribe: Baccharidinae
- Genus: Laestadia; Kunth ex Less. 1832, not Auersw. 1869 (Gnomoniaceae in Ascomycota)

Type species
- Laestadia pinifolia Kunth ex Less.

Synonyms
- Lestadia Spach

Genus of flowering plants

Laestadia is a genus of Latin American flowering plants in the family Asteraceae.

Species

- Laestadia domingensis Urb. - Dominican Republic
- Laestadia lechleri Wedd. - Peru
- Laestadia muscicola Sch.Bip. ex Wedd. - Peru
- Laestadia pinifolia Kunth ex Less. - Colombia
- Laestadia rupestris Benth. - Colombia
