= Skottsbergiella =

Scientific classification
- Kingdom: Fungi
- Division: Ascomycota
- Class: Sordariomycetes
- Order: Diaporthales
- Family: Gnomoniaceae
- Genus: Skottsbergiella; Petr.

Type species
- Skottsbergiella diaporthoides Petr.

Genus of fungi

Skottsbergiella is a genus of fungi in the family Gnomoniaceae. This is a monotypic genus, containing the single species Skottsbergiella diaporthoides, first described by Franz Petrak in 1927.

The genus and species were circumscribed by Petrak in Nat. Hist. Juan Fernandez Easter Island (Skottsberg) vol.2 on page 481 in 1927.

The genus name of Skottsbergiella is in honour of Carl Johan Fredrik Skottsberg (1880–1963), who was a Swedish botanist and explorer of Antarctica.
