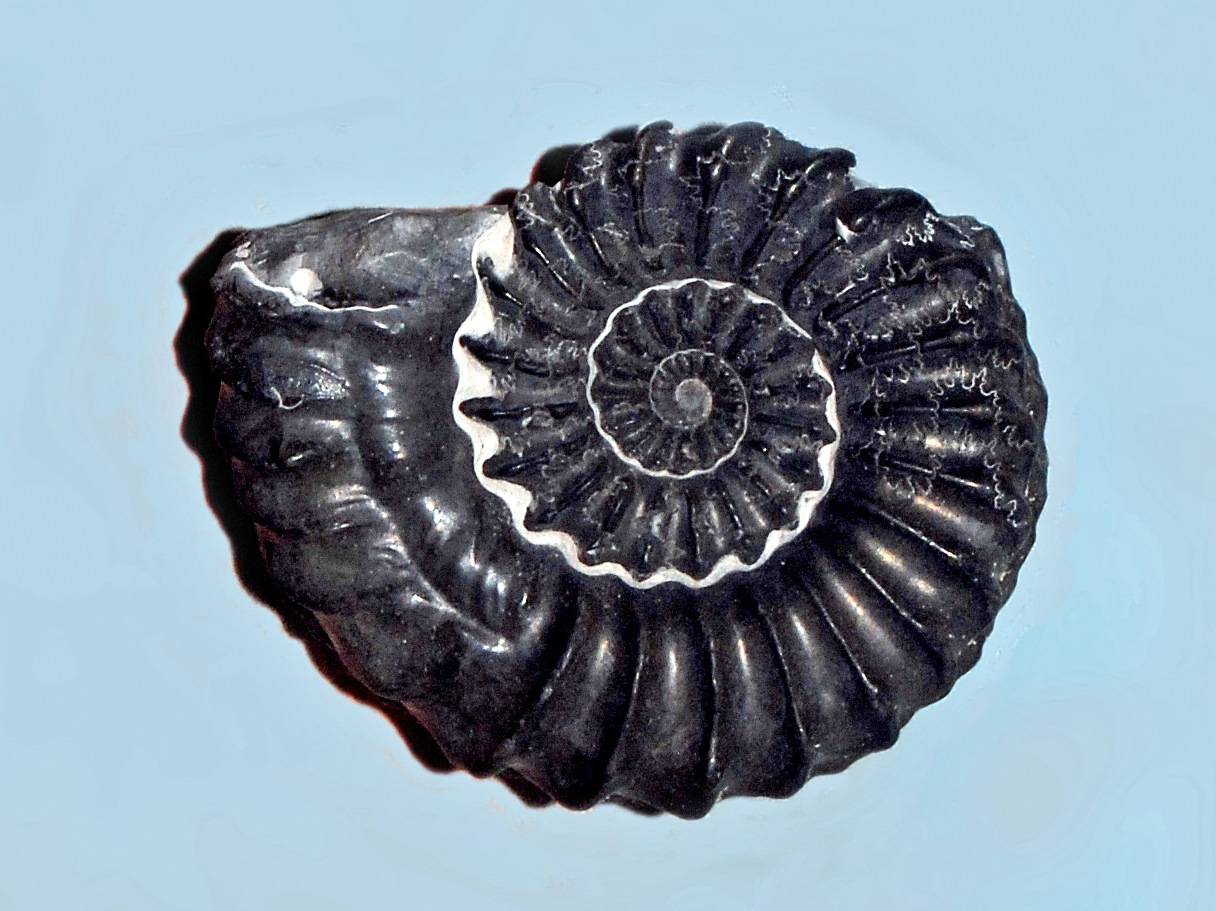
- Pleuroceras sp. from Germany

Scientific classification
- Kingdom: Fungi
- Division: Ascomycota
- Class: Sordariomycetes
- Order: Diaporthales
- Family: Gnomoniaceae
- Genus: Pleuroceras; Riess

Type species
- Pleuroceras ciliatum Riess

= Pleuroceras (fungus) =

Genus of fungi

Pleuroceras is a genus of fungi in the family Gnomoniaceae. The genus was first described by H. Riess in 1854. Several species in the genus are plant pathogens. The genus contains 12 species.

== Species ==
- P. arollanum
- P. bottnicum
- P. ciliatum
- P. cryptoderis
- P. gleditschiae
- P. groenlandicum
- P. helveticum
- P. insulare
- P. labradorense
- P. lirelliformis
- P. lobeliae
- P. oregonense
- P. pleurostylum
- P. populi
- P. propinquum
- P. pseudoplatani
- P. quercicola
- P. quercinum
- P. rousseaui
- P. sassafras
- P. tenellum
- P. virgularum
