= Diplodina (fungus) =

Scientific classification
- Domain: Eukaryota
- Kingdom: Fungi
- Division: Ascomycota
- Class: Sordariomycetes
- Order: Diaporthales
- Family: Gnomoniaceae
- Genus: Diplodina; Westend. (1857)

Type species
- Diplodina salicis Westend. (1857)

Synonyms
- Diploplenodomopsis Petr. (1923); Diplosclerophoma Petr. (1923); Fioriella Sacc. & D.Sacc. (1905)

Genus of fungi

Diplodina is a genus of fungi belonging to the family Gnomoniaceae.

Species:

- Diplodina acerina
- Diplodina calamagrostidis
- Diplodina grossulariae
- Diplodina moelleriana
