= Cryptosporiopsis =

Scientific classification
- Domain: Eukaryota
- Kingdom: Fungi
- Division: Ascomycota
- Class: Leotiomycetes
- Order: Helotiales
- Family: Dermateaceae
- Genus: Cryptosporiopsis; Bubák & Kabát

Genus of fungi

Cryptosporiopsis is a genus of fungi belonging to the family Dermateaceae.

The genus has cosmopolitan distribution.

== Species ==
Species:

- Cryptosporiopsis alnea (Rostr.) Petr.
- Cryptosporiopsis aucubicola (Sacc.) v.d.Aa
- Cryptosporiopsis balsameae Robak
