= Monostichella coryli =

Scientific classification
- Kingdom: Fungi
- Division: Ascomycota
- Class: Leotiomycetes
- Order: Helotiales
- Family: Dermateaceae
- Genus: Monostichella
- Species: M. coryli

Binomial name
- Monostichella coryli (Roberge ex Desm.) Höhn.

Synonyms
- Cheilaria coryli Roberge ex Desm. (1853); Gloeosporium coryli (Desm.) Sacc. Piggotia coryli (Desm.) B. Sutton (1980)

Species of fungus

Monostichella coryli is a plant pathogen infecting hazelnuts.
