= Anguillosporella vermiformis =

Scientific classification
- Kingdom: Fungi
- Division: Ascomycota
- Class: Dothideomycetes
- Order: Mycosphaerellales
- Family: Mycosphaerellaceae
- Genus: Anguillosporella
- Species: A. vermiformis

Binomial name
- Anguillosporella vermiformis (Davis) U. Braun, (1995)

Synonyms
- Anguillospora vermiformis (Davis) Redhead & G.P. White, (1985); Cercoseptoria vermiformis (Davis) Davis, (1942); Cylindrosporium vermiforme Davis, (1916)

Species of fungus

Anguillosporella vermiformis is an ascomycete fungus that is a plant pathogen.
