= Monochaetia coryli =

Scientific classification
- Domain: Eukaryota
- Kingdom: Fungi
- Division: Ascomycota
- Class: Sordariomycetes
- Order: Amphisphaeriales
- Family: Sporocadaceae
- Genus: Monochaetia
- Species: M. coryli

Binomial name
- Monochaetia coryli (Rostr.) Sacc. & D.Sacc. (1906)

Synonyms
- Pestalotia coryli Rostr. (1895)

Species of fungus

Monochaetia coryli is a species of fungus in the family Amphisphaeriaceae. It is a plant pathogen.
