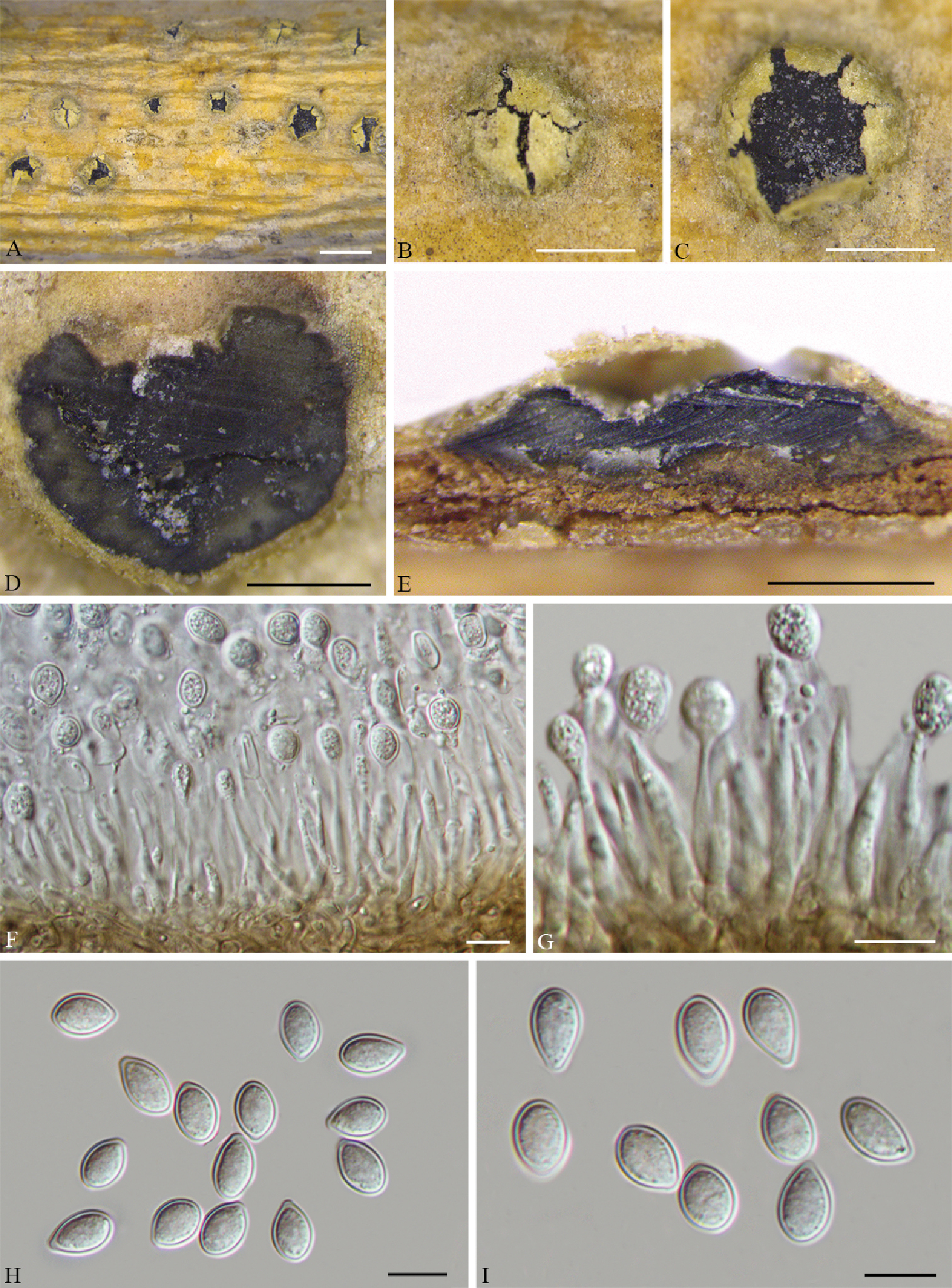
- Plagiostoma populinum

Scientific classification
- Kingdom: Fungi
- Division: Ascomycota
- Class: Sordariomycetes
- Order: Diaporthales
- Family: Gnomoniaceae
- Genus: Plagiostoma; Fuckel

Type species
- Plagiostoma euphorbiae (Fuckel) Fuckel

= Plagiostoma (fungus) =

Genus of fungi

Plagiostoma is a genus of parasitic ascomycete fungi within the family Gnomoniaceae, whose members cause leaf spot diseases in various plant hosts. The genus contains around 22 species.
