= Septoria ostryae =

Scientific classification
- Kingdom: Fungi
- Division: Ascomycota
- Class: Dothideomycetes
- Order: Mycosphaerellales
- Family: Mycosphaerellaceae
- Genus: Septoria
- Species: S. ostryae

Binomial name
- Septoria ostryae Peck (1883)

Species of fungus

Septoria ostryae is a fungal plant pathogen infecting hazelnut. It causes discoloured blotches on the foliage and can cause leaves to drop prematurely.
