= Cryptodiaporthe =

Scientific classification
- Kingdom: Fungi
- Division: Ascomycota
- Class: Sordariomycetes
- Order: Diaporthales
- Family: Gnomoniaceae
- Genus: Cryptodiaporthe; Petr.

Type species
- Cryptodiaporthe aesculi (Fuckel) Petr.

Genus of fungi

Cryptodiaporthe is a genus of fungi in the family Gnomoniaceae. The genus contains 24 species.
