= Hazelnut =

Nut of the hazel tree

Ripe hazelnuts

The hazelnut is the fruit of the hazel tree and therefore includes any of the nuts deriving from species of the genus Corylus, especially the nuts of the species Corylus avellana. They are also known as cobnuts or filberts according to species.

Hazelnuts are used as a snack food, in baking and desserts, and in breakfast cereals such as muesli. In confectionery, they are used to make praline, and also used in combination with chocolate for chocolate truffles and products such as chocolate bars and hazelnut cocoa spreads such as Nutella. They are also used in Frangelico liqueur. Hazelnut oil, pressed from hazelnuts, is strongly flavored and high in monounsaturated fat. It is used as a cooking oil and as a salad or vegetable dressing.

In 2023, Turkey was the world's largest producer of hazelnuts, accounting for 57.7% of total production.

== Description ==
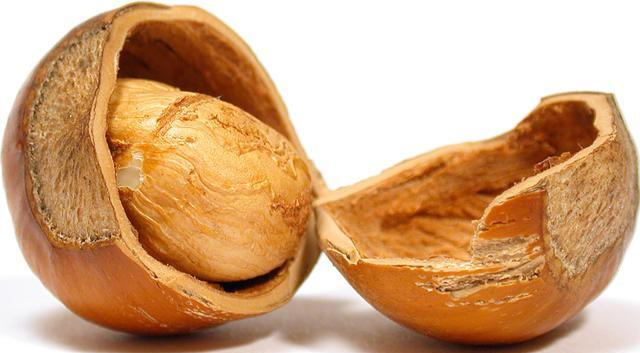
Cracked hazelnut shell displaying the edible seed

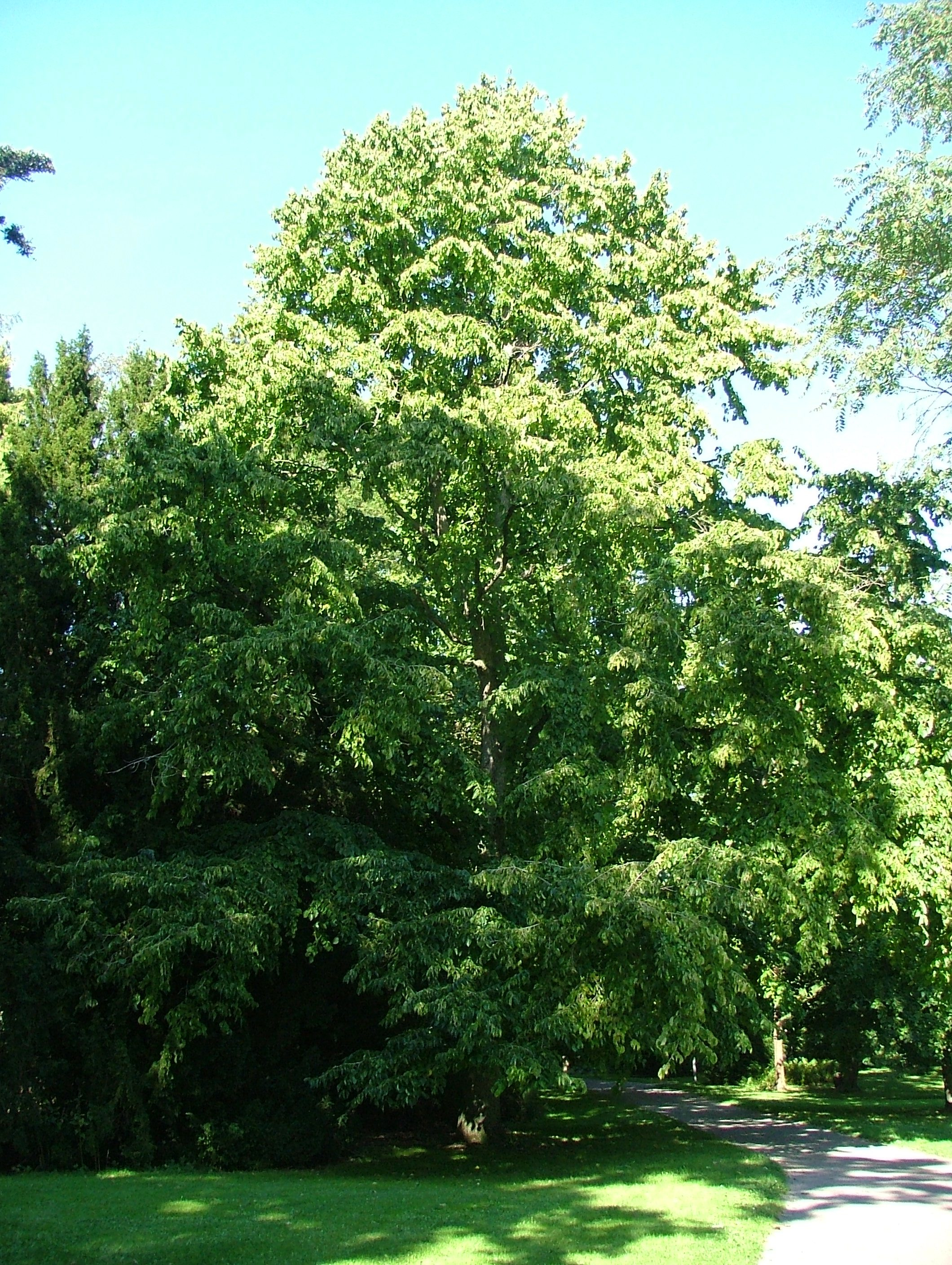
Hazelnut tree, Turkey

A hazelnut cob is roughly spherical to oval, about 15–25 millimetres (5/8–1 inch) long and 10–15 mm (3/8–5/8 in) in diameter, with an outer fibrous husk surrounding a smooth shell, while a filbert is more elongated, being about twice as long as its diameter. The nut falls out of the husk when ripe, about seven to eight months after pollination. The seed is edible and consumed raw, roasted, or ground into a paste. The seed has a thin, dark brown skin, which is sometimes removed before cooking.

Nuts make up between 33.2% to 49.5% of the fruit, depending on the cultivar grown. Cultivars close to the Mediterranean Sea have the largest nut to fruit ratio.

== Cultivation ==
=== History ===
In 1995, evidence of large-scale Mesolithic nut processing, some 8,000 years old, was found in a midden pit on the island of Colonsay in Scotland. The evidence consists of a large, shallow pit full of the remains of hundreds of thousands of burned hazelnut shells. Hazelnuts have been found on other Mesolithic sites, but rarely in such quantities or concentrated in one pit. The nuts were radiocarbon dated to 7720±110 BP, which calibrates to c. 6000 BCE. Similar sites in Britain are known only at Farnham in Surrey and Cass ny Hawin on the Isle of Man.

This discovery provides insight into communal activity and planning during the period. The nuts were harvested in a single year, and pollen analysis suggests that all of the hazel trees were cut down at the same time.

The scale of the activity and the scarcity of large game on the island suggest that Colonsay may have supported a community with a largely vegetarian diet during their time on the island. Originally, the pit was on a beach close to the shore and was associated with two smaller, stone-lined pits whose function remains obscure, a hearth, and a second cluster of pits.

The traditional method to increase nut production is called brutting, which involves prompting more of the tree's energy to go into flower bud production by snapping, but not breaking off, the tips of the new year shoots six or seven leaf groups from where they join with the trunk or branch, at the end of the growing season. The traditional term for an area of cultivated hazelnuts is a plat.

=== Cultivars ===
The many cultivars of the hazel include 'Atababa', 'Barcelona', 'Butler', 'Casina', 'Clark', 'Cosford', 'Daviana', 'Delle Langhe', 'England', 'Ennis', 'Halls Giant', 'Jemtegaard', 'Kent Cob', 'Lewis', 'Tokolyi', 'Tonda Gentile', 'Tonda di Giffoni', 'Tonda Romana', 'Wanliss Pride', and 'Willamette'. Some of these are grown for specific qualities of the nut, including large nut size or early or late fruiting, whereas others are grown as pollinators. The majority of commercial hazelnuts are propagated from root sprouts. Some cultivars are of hybrid origin between common hazel and filbert.

In Ireland and the United Kingdom, hazelnuts are sometimes referred to as cobnuts, for which a specific cultivated variety – Kentish cobnuts – is the main variety cultivated in fields known as plats, hand-picked, and eaten green. According to the BBC, a national collection of cobnut varieties exists at Roughway Farm, near Plaxtol in Kent. They are called cobnuts because cob was a word used to refer to the head or "noggin," and children had a game in which they would tie a string to a hazelnut and use it to try to hit an opponent on the head.

=== Cropping system ===
In Europe hazelnuts are traditionally grown as multi-trunk trees where the rootstock is formed by the variety itself. To enhance the possibility for mechanization and to prevent suckering, a single-trunk tree can be formed by grafting a scion of the desired variety on a Corylus colurna rootstock. There are different approaches in orchard floor management. Strong infestations of certain weeds can lower the yield. Therefore, to prevent yield loss by competition, herbicides are used to create bare soil. Using cover crops protects the soil and suppresses weed establishment without a yield reduction.

Silvopastoral systems where animals like pigs are kept in the orchard or silvoarable systems where crops are grown between the rows could introduce new sources of revenue into the hazelnut production and may have beneficial effects on hazelnut yield by fertilizing the soil through nitrogen fixation or animal dung. These systems limit the plant protection measures, potentially impacting the yield quality and level. There are very few studies on these systems, leading to a higher uncertainty for the producer.

=== Harvesting ===
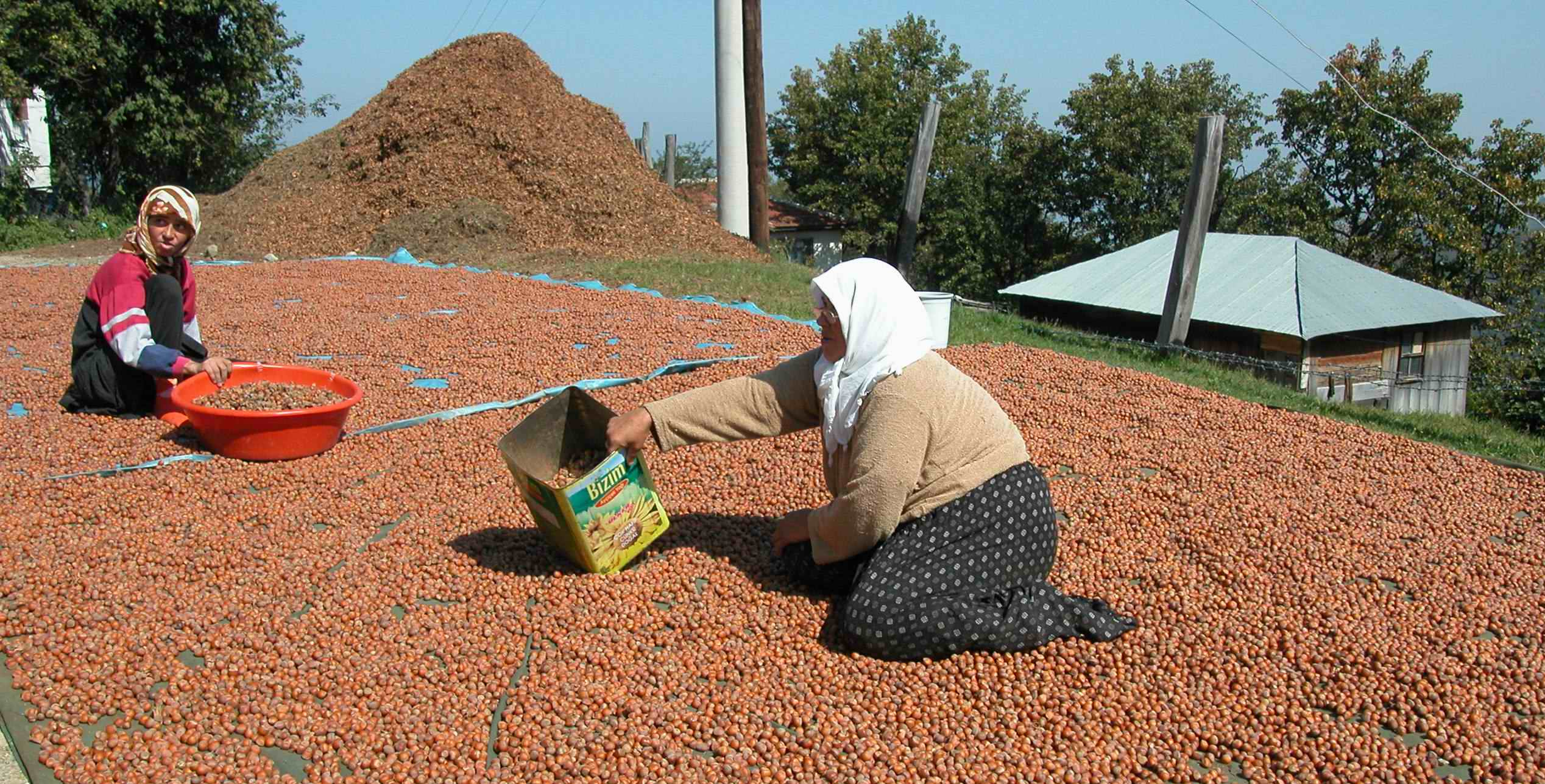
Hand-harvest and sun-drying of hazelnuts in Turkey

Hazelnuts are harvested annually in mid-autumn. As autumn comes to a close, the trees drop their nuts and leaves. Most commercial growers wait for the nuts to drop rather than using equipment to shake them from the tree. The harvesting of hazelnuts is performed either by hand or by manual or mechanical raking of fallen nuts.

Four primary pieces of equipment are used in commercial harvesting: the sweeper, the harvester, the nut cart, and the forklift. The sweeper moves the nuts into the center of the rows, the harvester lifts and separates the nuts from any debris (i.e., twigs and leaves), the nut cart holds the nuts picked up by the harvester, and the forklift brings a tote to offload the nuts from the nut cart and then stacks the totes to be shipped to the processor (nut dryer).

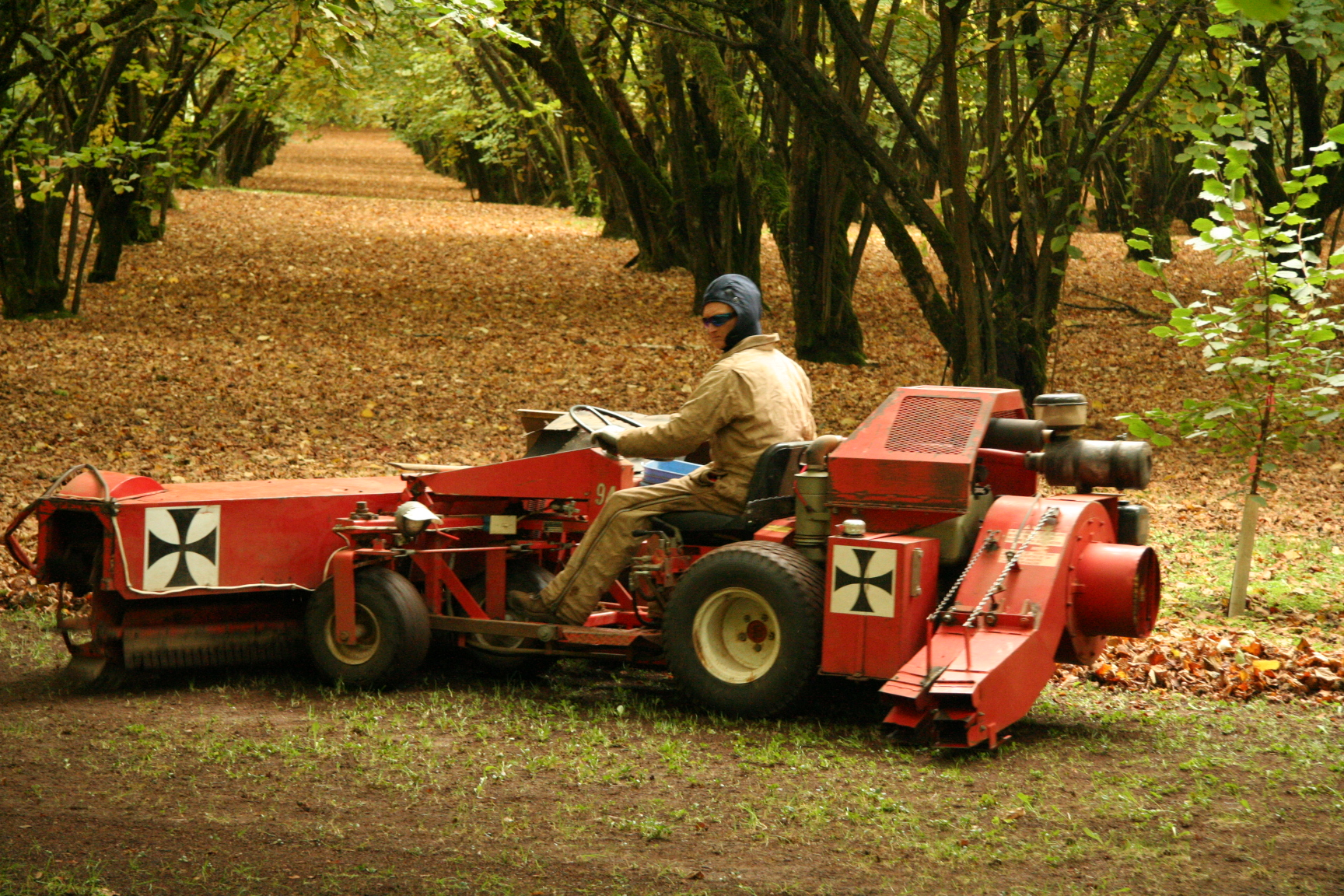
A sweeper gathers hazelnuts in an orchard

The sweeper is a low-to-the-ground machine that makes two passes in each tree row. It has a 2 m (6 ft 7 in) belt attached to the front that rotates to sweep leaves, nuts, and small twigs from left to right, depositing the material in the center of the row as it drives forward. On the rear of the sweeper is a powerful blower to blow material left into the adjacent row with air speeds up to 90 m/s (300 ft/s). Careful grooming during the year and patient blowing at harvest may eliminate the need for hand raking around the tree trunk, where nuts may accumulate. The sweeper prepares a single center row of nuts, narrow enough for the harvesting tractor to drive over without driving on the center row. It is best to sweep only a few rows ahead of the harvesters at any given time, to prevent the tractor that drives the harvester from crushing the nuts that may still be falling from the trees. Hazelnut orchards may be harvested up to three times during the harvest season, depending on the number of nuts in the trees and the rate of nut drop due to the weather.

The harvester is a slow-moving machine pushed by a tractor, which lifts the material off the ground and separates the nuts from the leaves, empty husks, and twigs. As the harvester drives over the rows, a rotating cylinder with hundreds of tines rakes the material onto a belt. The belt takes the material over a blower and under a powerful vacuum that sucks any lightweight soil, leaves from the nuts, and discharges them into the orchard. The remaining nuts are conveyed into a cart pulled behind the harvester. Once a tote is filled with nuts, the forklift hauls away the full totes and brings empty ones back to the harvester to maximize the harvester's time.

Two different timing strategies are used for collecting the fallen nuts. The first is to harvest early when about half of the nuts have fallen. With less material on the ground, the harvester can work faster with less chance of a breakdown. The second option is to wait for all the nuts to fall before harvesting. Although the first option is considered the better of the two, two or three passes do take more time to complete than one.

== Production ==
Hazelnuts production 2023, tonnes
Turkey	650,000
Italy	102,740
United States	85,460
Azerbaijan	75,409
Chile	65,647
Georgia	36,900
World	1,125,221
Source: FAOSTAT of the United Nations

In 2023, world production of hazelnuts (in shells) was 1.13 million tonnes led by Turkey with 57.7% of the total, and Italy and the United States as other major producers (table).

Production in the United States is centered almost entirely within the Willamette Valley of Oregon.

Production of hazelnuts

Hazelnut yield

== Food ==
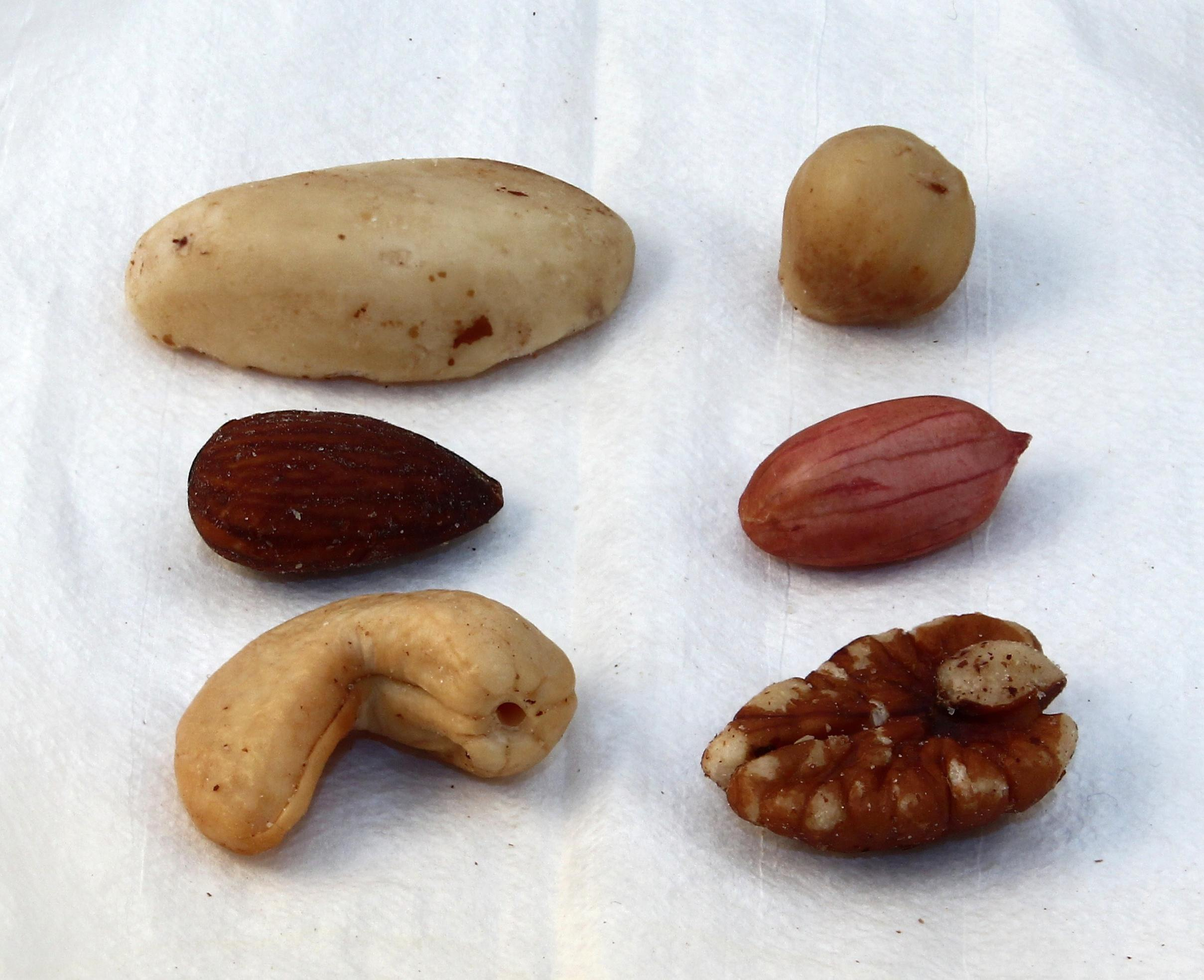
Hazelnut (upper right) among other edible nuts (clockwise from middle right): peanut, pecan, cashew, almond, and Brazil nut

Hazelnuts are used in confections to make pralines, chocolate truffles, and hazelnut paste products including nougat. The combination of ground hazelnuts with chocolate developed around Turin, Italy, is called gianduja; with finer pulverization of the hazelnuts, this subsequently developed into gianduiotto and Nutella. In Austria, hazelnut paste is an ingredient for making tortes, such as Viennese hazelnut torte. In Kyiv cake, hazelnut flour is used to flavor its meringue body, and crushed hazelnuts are sprinkled over its sides. Dacquoise, a French dessert cake, often contains a layer of hazelnut meringue. Hazelnuts are used in Turkish cuisine and Georgian cuisine; the snack churchkhela and sauce satsivi are used, often with walnuts. Hazelnuts are also a common constituent of muesli. The nuts may be eaten fresh or dried, having different flavors.

=== Nutrition ===
Nutritional value per 100 g
- Energy: 2,629 kJ (628 kcal)
- Carbohydrates: 16.70 g
- Sugars: 4.34 g
- Dietary fiber: 9.7 g
- Fat: 60.75 g
- Protein: 14.95 g
Vitamins and minerals
Vitamins	Quantity %DV^{†}
Vitamin A equiv. beta-Carotene lutein zeaxanthin	0% 1 μg 0% 11 μg 92 μg
Thiamine (B1)	54% 0.643 mg
Riboflavin (B2)	9% 0.113 mg
Niacin (B3)	11% 1.8 mg
Pantothenic acid (B5)	18% 0.918 mg
Vitamin B6	33% 0.563 mg
Folate (B9)	28% 113 μg
Vitamin C	7% 6.3 mg
Vitamin E	100% 15.03 mg
Vitamin K	12% 14.2 μg
Minerals	Quantity %DV^{†}
Calcium	9% 114 mg
Iron	26% 4.7 mg
Magnesium	39% 163 mg
Manganese	268% 6.175 mg
Phosphorus	23% 290 mg
Potassium	23% 680 mg
Selenium	4% 2.4 μg
Sodium	0% 0 mg
Zinc	22% 2.45 mg
- Other constituents: Quantity
- Water: 5.31 g
- Full Link to complete USDA Database entry
- ^{†}Percentages estimated using US recommendations for adults, except for potassium, which is estimated based on expert recommendation from the National Academies.

Raw hazelnuts are 5% water, 61% fat, 17% carbohydrates, and 15% protein (table).

In a 100-gram (3 1/2-ounce) reference amount, raw hazelnuts supply 2,630 kilojoules (628 kilocalories) of food energy and are a rich source (20% or more of the Daily Value, DV) of numerous essential nutrients (see table).

Hazelnuts contain particularly high amounts of protein, dietary fiber, vitamin E, thiamin, folate, manganese, and magnesium, all exceeding 20% DV (table). In moderate amounts (10–19% DV) are niacin, pantothenic acid, vitamin K, zinc, and potassium (table).

Hazelnuts are a rich source of dietary fat, accounting for 93% DV in a 100-gram amount. The fat components are monounsaturated fat as oleic acid (75% of total), polyunsaturated fat mainly as linoleic acid (13% of total), and saturated fat, mainly as palmitic acid and stearic acid (together, 7% of total; USDA source in table).

== In culture ==
The hazelnut is used as a literary device by Julian of Norwich (c. 1343 – after 1416) within her mystical Christian treatise Revelations of Divine Love. The hazelnut shell is imagined as a chariot for the fairy Queen Mab within English playwright and poet William Shakespeare's play Romeo and Juliet. The hazel fruit is also used as a metaphorical device in the poem To Autumn by the English Romantic poet John Keats.

== Gallery ==
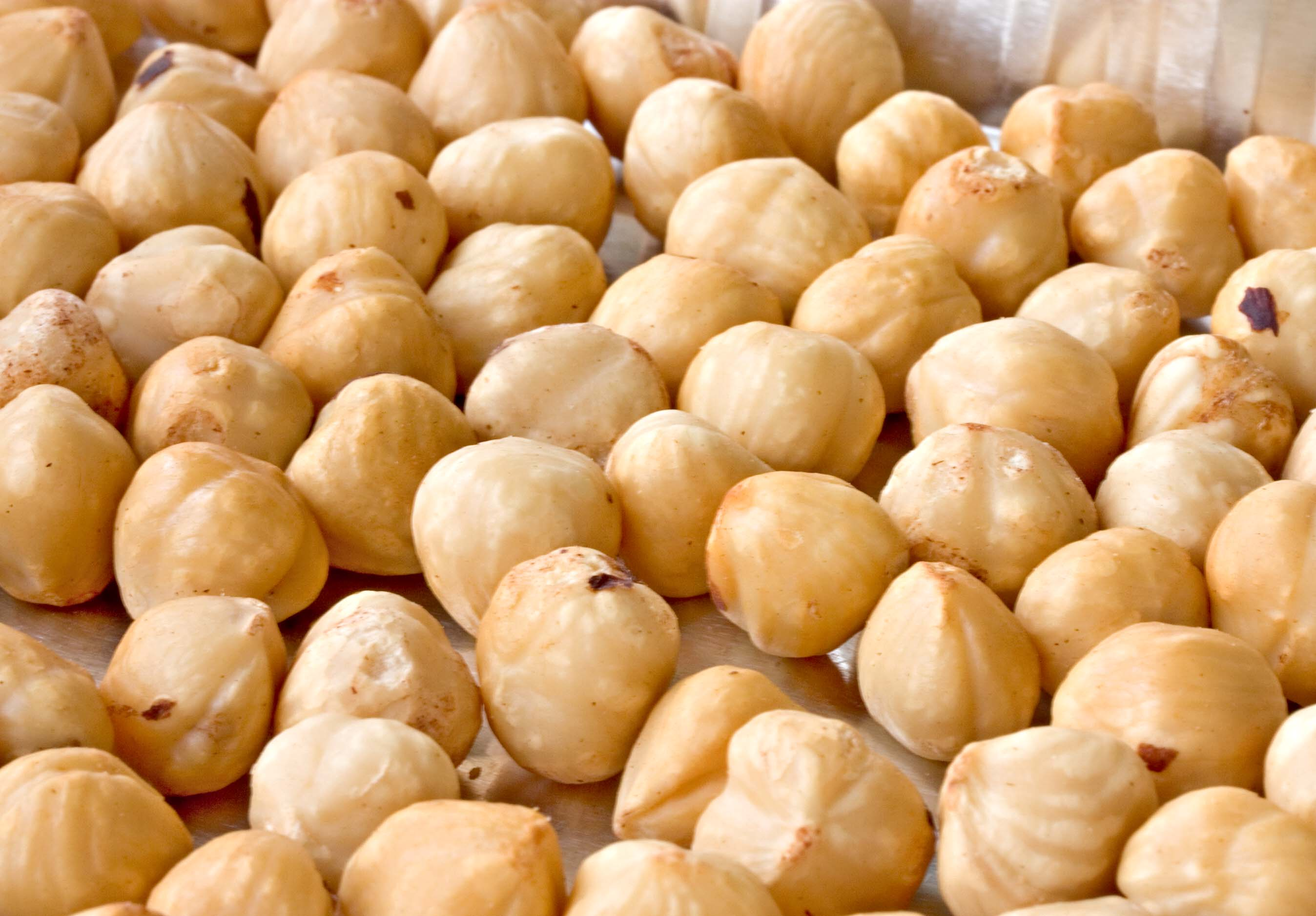
Dehulled, skinned, and smoked hazelnuts

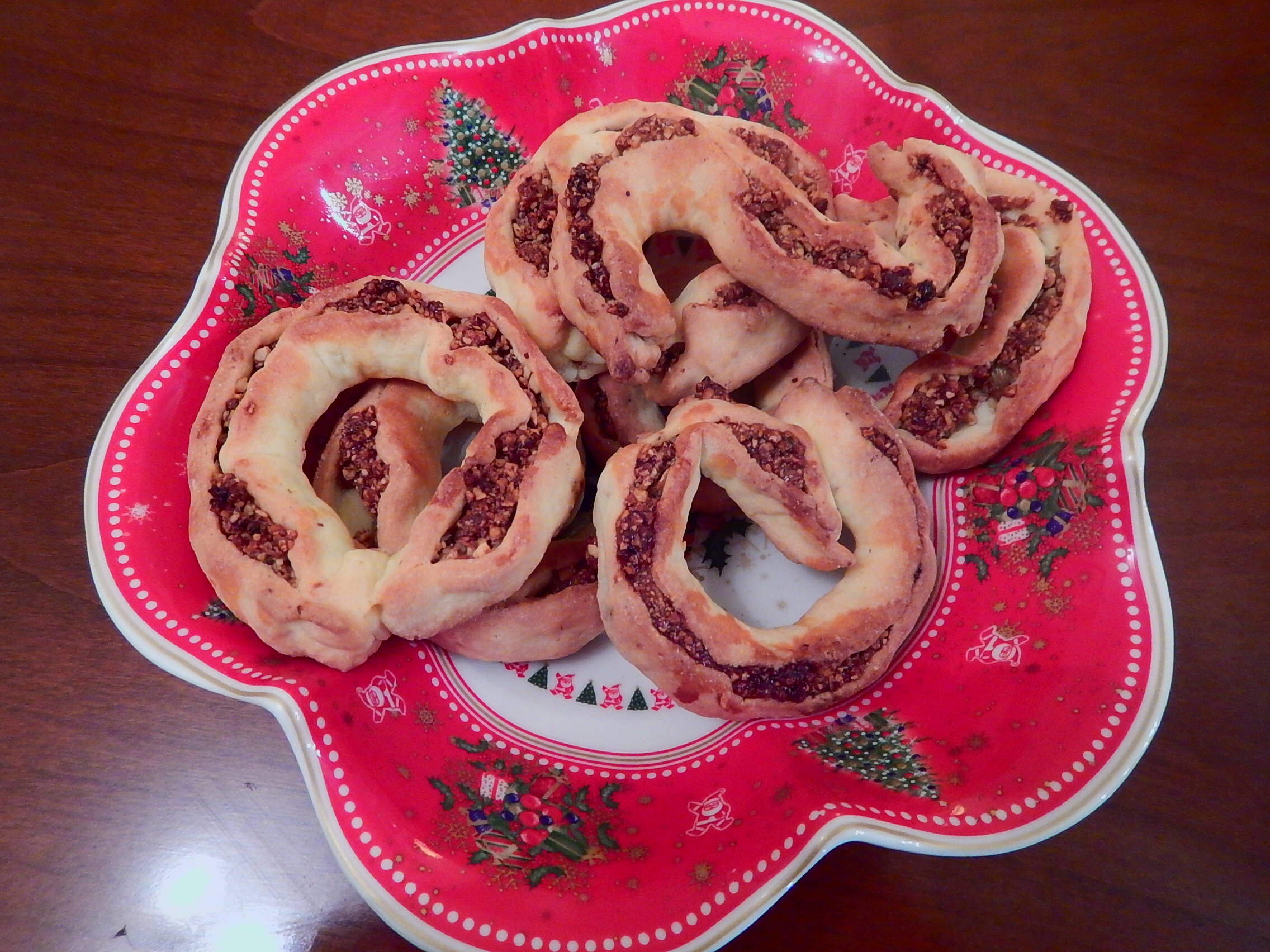
Piccillatti, typical biscuits made with hazelnuts, Sicily

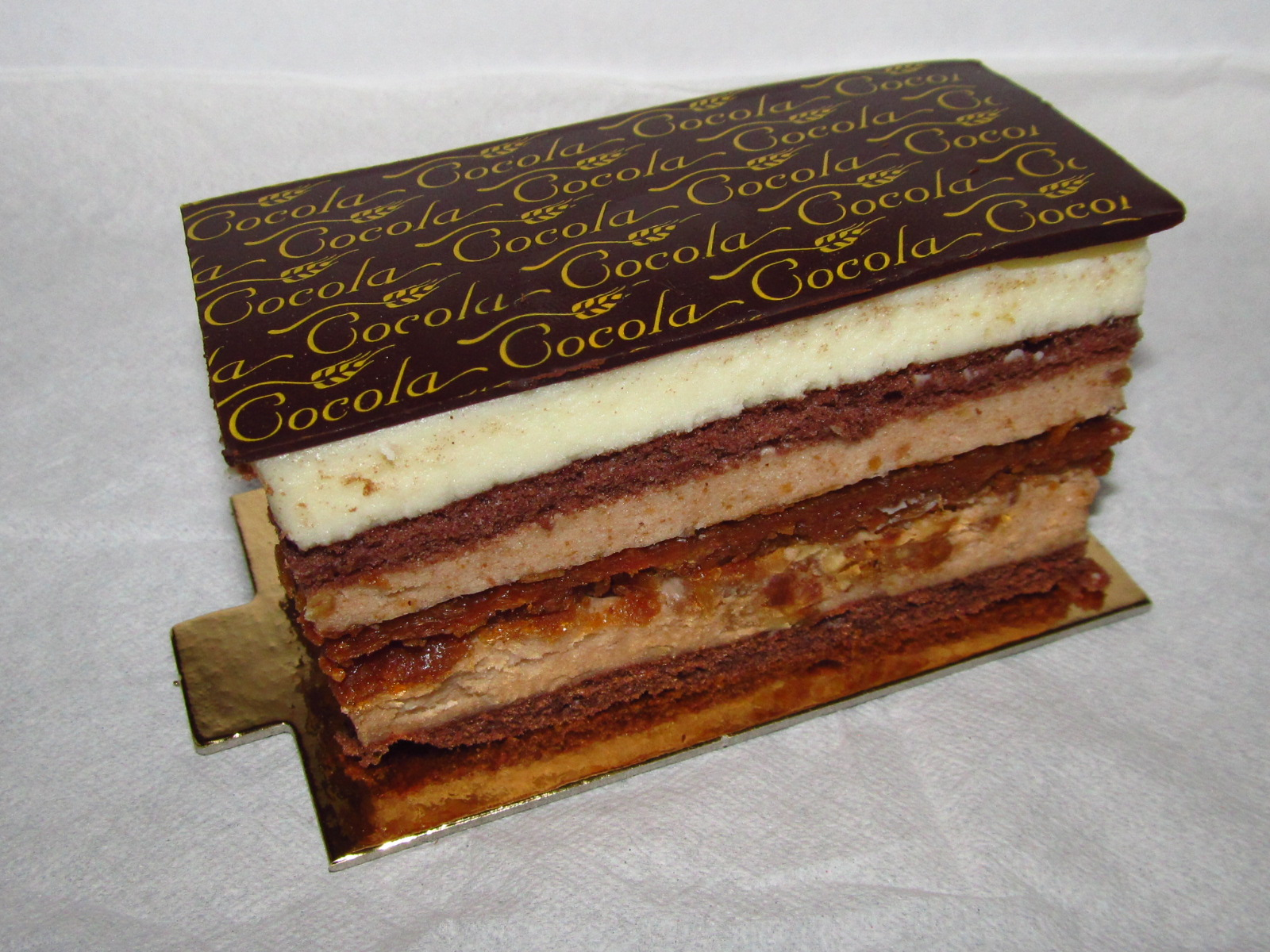
Hazelnut cake

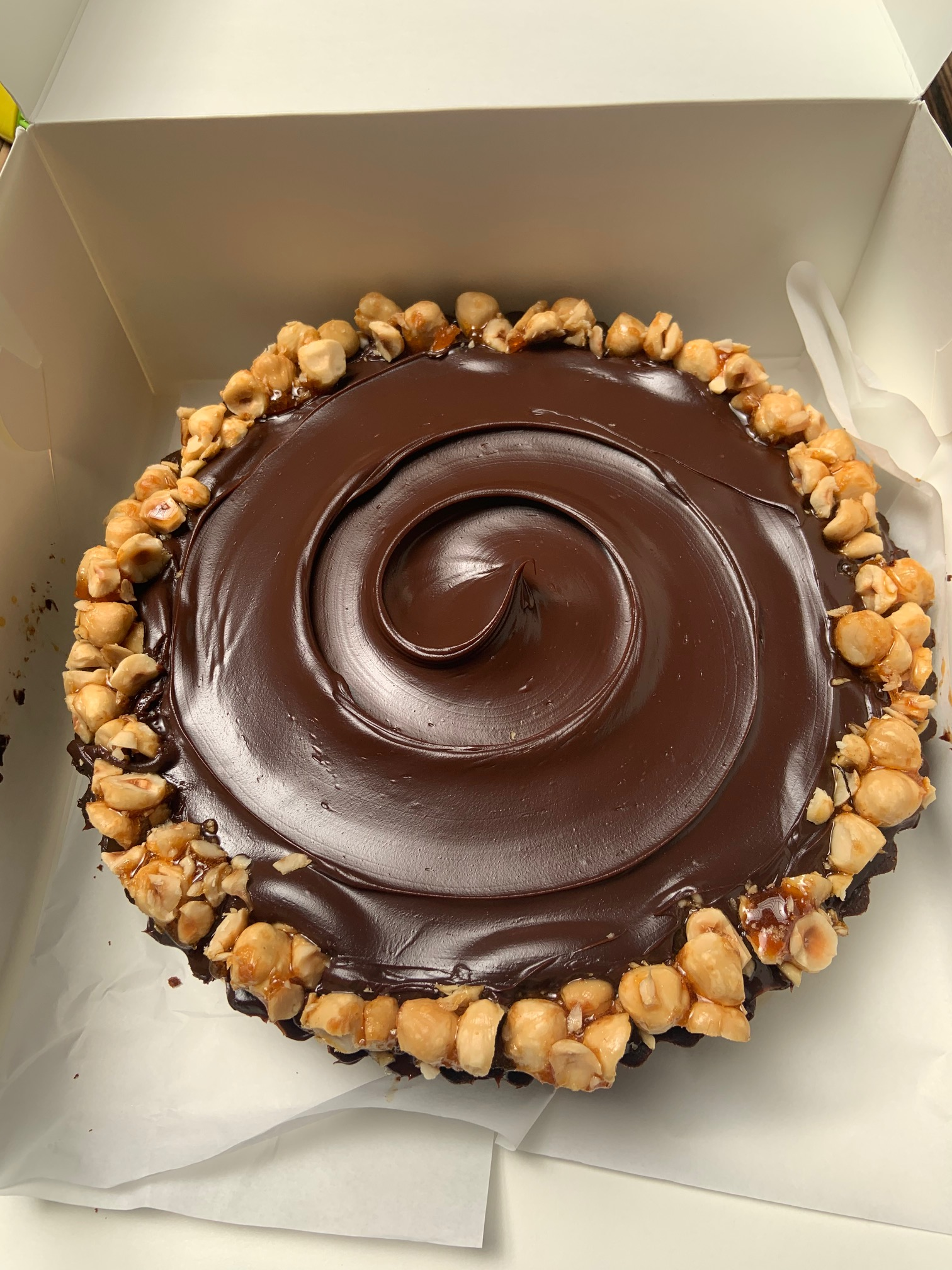
Chocolate pie with hazelnut crust

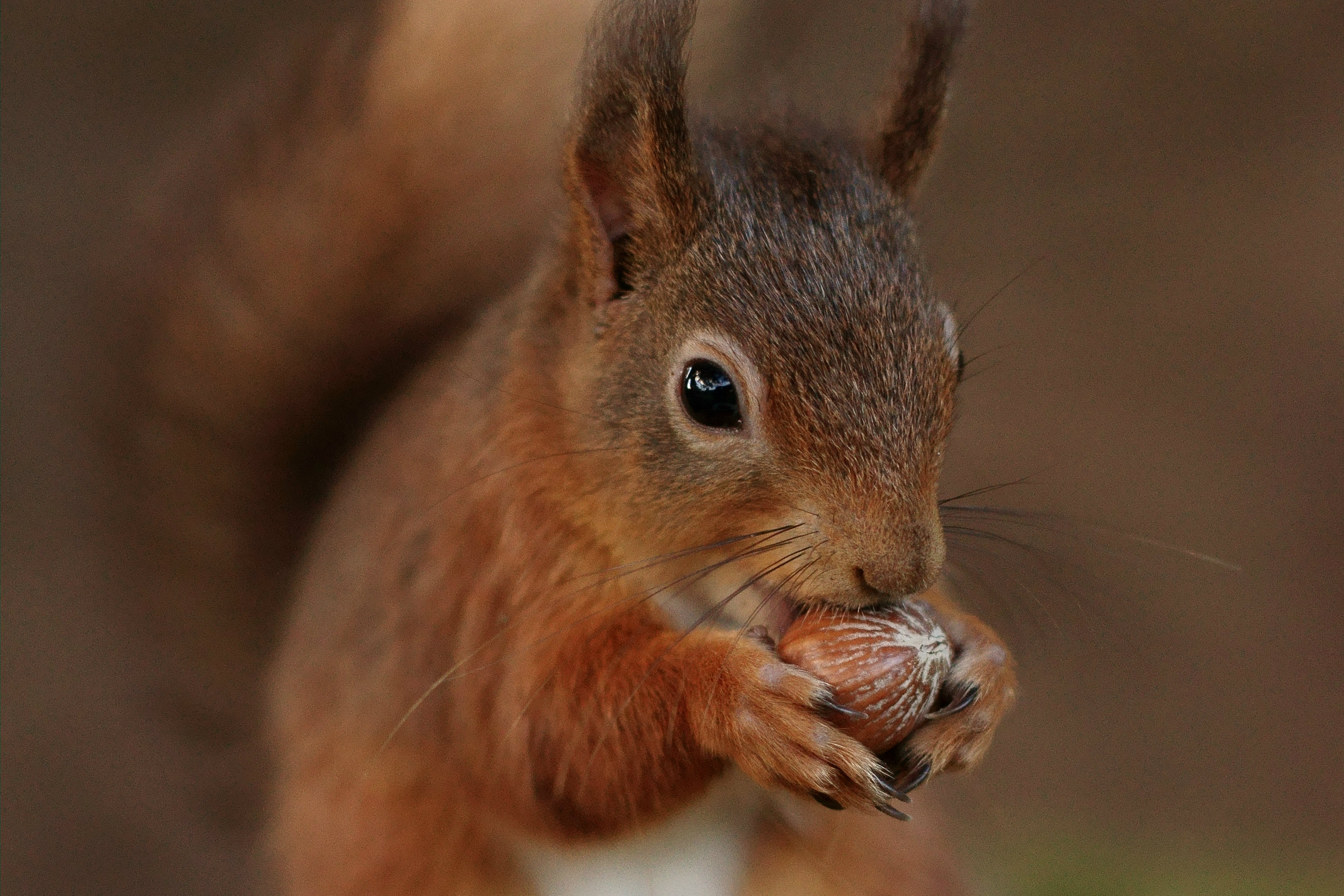
Red squirrel (Sciurus vulgaris) eating a hazelnut, England

== See also ==
- Filbertone, the principal flavor compound of hazelnuts
- Frangelico
- List of hazelnut diseases
- The Hazelnut Child
