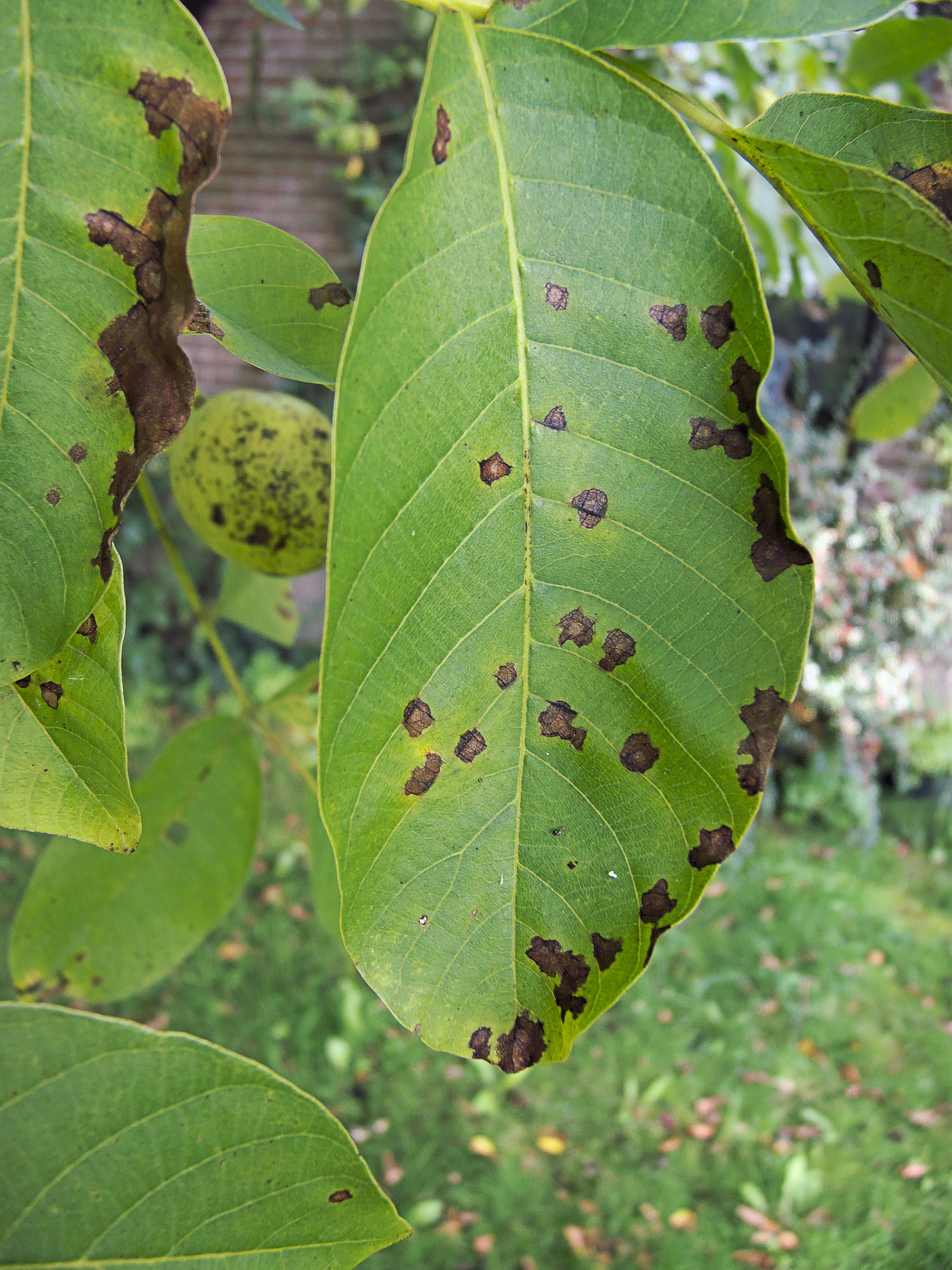
- Gnomonia leptostyla on Juglans regia Buccaneer

Scientific classification
- Kingdom: Fungi
- Division: Ascomycota
- Class: Sordariomycetes
- Order: Diaporthales
- Family: Gnomoniaceae; G.Winter (1886)

Type genus
- Gnomonia Ces. & De Not. (1863)

= Gnomoniaceae =

Family of fungi

Gnomoniaceae is a family of fungi in the order Diaporthales. The family was circumscribed by German botanist Heinrich Georg Winter in 1886.

== Genera ==
As accepted by GBIF:

- Alnecium Voglmayr H. & Jaklitsch W. (2)
- Ambarignomonia M.V.Sogonov, 2008 (2)
- Anisogramma Theiss. & Syd. (6)
- Anisomyces Theissen & H.Sydow, 1914 (2)
- Apiognomonia Höhn. (32)
- Asteroma DC. (115)
- Bagcheea E.Müller & R.Menon, 1954 (3)
- Ceuthocarpon (6)
- Chondroplea Kleb., 1933 (1)
- Clypeoporthe Höhn. (5)
- Cryptoderis Auersw. (7)
- Cryptodiaporthe Petr. (27)
- Cryptospora Tul. & C.Tul. (8)
- Cryptosporella Sacc., 1877 (45)
- Cylindrosporella (6)
- Cytodiplospora Oudem. (13)
- Depazea Fr. (13)
- Diaporthella Petr. (7)
- Diplacella Syd. (2)
- Diplodina Westendorp, 1857 (318)
- Diploplenodomopsis (7)
- Diplosclerophoma (2)
- Discosporium Höhn., 1915 (10)
- Discula P.A.Saccardo, 1884 (41)
- Ditopella De Not. (14)
- Ditopellopsis J.Reid & C.Booth, 1967 (4)
- Fioriella (1)
- Flavignomonia C.M.Tian, Q.Yang & N.Jiang (1)
- Gloeosporidina Petr., 1921 (6)
- Gloeosporidium (6)
- Gnomonia Cesati & de Notaris, 1863 (145)
- Gnomoniella Sacc. (34)
- Gnomoniopsis Berl. (40)
- Greeneria Scribn. & Viala (4)
- Laestadia Auersw., 1869 (33)
- Ligniella (3)
- Linospora Fuckel, 1870 (23)
- Mamiania Ces. & De Not. (1)
- Mamianiella Höhn. (3)
- Marsupiomyces Senan. & K.D.Hyde, 2017 (3)
- Melanopelta (1)
- Millerburtonia Ciferri, 1951 (1)
- Neognomoniopsis Crous, 2019 (2
- Neomarssoniella U.Braun (1)
- Occultocarpon L.C.Mejía & Zhu L.Yang, 2012 (2)
- Ophiognomonia (Sacc.) Sacc. (92)
- Ophiovalsa Petr. (4)
- Phragmoporthe Petr. (3)
- Phylloporthe H.Sydow, 1925 (1)
- Plagiostoma Fuckel, 1870 (86)
- Plagiostomella (1)
- Pleuroceras Riess (23)
- Radulum Fr. (11)
- Rehmiella G.Winter, 1883 (1)
- Rostrocoronophora Munk (2)
- Septomyxa Sacc. (13)
- Sirococcus Preuss, 1855 (35)
- Skottsbergiella Petrak, 1927 (1)
- Spataporthe A.W.Bronson, A.A.Klymiuk, R.A.Stockey & A.M.F.Tomescu, 2013 (1)
- Stegastroma (1)
- Titaeosporina Luijk (1)
- Uniseta Ciccarone, 1948 (1)
- Valseutypella (4)
- Winterella (3)
- Xenotypa Petr. (1)

Figures in brackets are approx. how many species per genus.

The genera Lambro and Uleoporthe were formerly part of this family, but are now in family Sydowiellaceae.
