= Sphaerodothis =

Scientific classification
- Kingdom: Fungi
- Division: Ascomycota
- Class: Sordariomycetes
- Order: Phyllachorales
- Family: Phyllachoraceae
- Genus: Sphaerodothis (Sacc. & P. Syd.) Shear

Type species
- Sphaerodothis arengae (Racib.) Shear ex Theiss. & Syd.

Genus of fungi

Sphaerodothis is a genus of fungi in the family Phyllachoraceae.

== Species ==
As accepted by Species Fungorum;

- Sphaerodothis arengae (Racib.) Shear ex Theiss. & Syd. (1915)
- Sphaerodothis balansae (Tassi) Höhn. ex Theiss. & Syd. (1915)
- Sphaerodothis borassi T.S. Ramakr. & K. Ramakr. (1950)
- Sphaerodothis circumscripta (Berk.) Theiss. & Syd. (1915)
- Sphaerodothis consociata Chardón (1934)
- Sphaerodothis densa (E. Bommer & M. Rousseau) Shear (1909)
- Sphaerodothis furcraeae Chardón (1934)
- Sphaerodothis gaultheriae Petr. (1963)
- Sphaerodothis guilielmae (Henn.) Shear (1909)
- Sphaerodothis luquillensis Chardón (1929)
- Sphaerodothis merianiae Garcés (1944)
- Sphaerodothis merrillii (Henn.) Theiss. & Syd. (1915)
- Sphaerodothis pirifera (Speg.) Theiss. & Syd. (1915)
- Sphaerodothis raoi A. Pande (1975)
- Sphaerodothis schweinfurthii Reichert (1921)
- Sphaerodothis tetracerae Bat., Maia & C.T. Vasconc. (1960)
- Sphaerodothis trinitensis Chardón (1932)
- Sphaerodothis viticifoliae Bat. & Nascim. (1956)

Former species;

- S. acrocomiae Chardón & R.E.D. Baker (1951) = Camarotella costaricensis, Phyllachoraceae
- S. acrocomiae (Mont.) Arx & E. Müll. (1954) = Camarotella acrocomiae, Phyllachoraceae
- S. antioquensis Chardón (1929) = Phyllachora columbiensis, Phyllachoraceae
- S. arxii P.F. Cannon (1989) = Parberya arxii, Phyllachoraceae
- S. calospora Syd. (1924) = Sphaerodothella danthoniae, Phyllachoraceae
- S. chamaeropis (Cooke) Shear (1909) = Phaeochora steinheilii, Phaeochoraceae
- S. coimbatorica T.S. Ramakr. & K. Ramakr. (1951) = Malthomyces coimbatoricus, Phyllachoraceae
- S. columbiensis Chardón (1930) = Phyllachora columbiensis, Phyllachoraceae
- S. dactylidis (Delacr.) Theiss. & Syd. (1915) = Phyllachora dactylidis, Phyllachoraceae
- S. danthoniae (McAlpine) J. Walker & S.M. Francis (1977) = Sphaerodothella danthoniae, Phyllachoraceae
- S. diplothemiifolii Bat. & F. Peres (1966) = Phaeochoropsis diplothemiifolii, Phaeochoraceae
- S. gramineae Bat. & Peres (1960) = Phyllachora cynodontis, Phyllachoraceae
- S. livistonae Tak. Kobay. (1973) = Phaeochora livistonae, Phaeochoraceae
- S. magnifica Petr. (1947) = Sphaerodothella danthoniae, Phyllachoraceae
- S. neowashingtoniae Shear (1909) = Phaeochoropsis neowashingtoniae, Phaeochoraceae
- S. palmicola (Speg.) Shear (1909) = Coccostromopsis palmicola, Phyllachoraceae
- S. phoenicis (Rolland) P. Joly (1961) = Serenomyces phoenicis, Phaeochoraceae
- S. poincianae Bat., J.L. Bezerra & Matta (1967) = Phyllachora schizolobiicola, Phyllachoraceae
- S. portoricensis Chardón (1932) = Phyllachora portoricensis, Phyllachoraceae
- S. pringlei (Peck) Theiss. & Syd. (1915) = Apodothina pringlei, Sordariomycetes
- S. rimosa (Speg.) Shear (1909) = Camarotella acrocomiae, Phyllachoraceae
- S. scleriae (Rehm) F. Stevens (1927) = Phyllachora scleriae, Phyllachoraceae
- S. sphaerosperma (G. Winter) F. Stevens & W.D. Moore (1927) = Phyllachora sphaerosperma, Phyllachoraceae
- S. steinheilii (Mont.) P. Joly (1961) = Phaeochora steinheilii, Phaeochoraceae
- S. torrendiella (Bat.) J.L. Bezerra (1991) = Camarotella torrendiella, Phyllachoraceae
