= Phaeochora =

Scientific classification
- Kingdom: Fungi
- Division: Ascomycota
- Class: Sordariomycetes
- Order: Phyllachorales
- Family: Phyllachoraceae
- Genus: Phaeochora; Höhn. 1909

Genus of fungi

Phaeochora is a genus of fungi within the family Phaeochoraceae.

== Species ==
As accepted by Species Fungorum;

- Phaeochora indaya Viégas (1944)
- Phaeochora livistonae (Tak. Kobay.) K.D. Hyde & P.F. Cannon (1999)
- Phaeochora sphaerotheca (Earle) Moesz (1922)
- Phaeochora steinheilii (Mont.) E. Müll. (1965)

Former species;

- P. acrocomiae (Mont.) Theiss. & Syd. (1915) = Camarotella acrocomiae, Phyllachoraceae
- P. calamigena (Berk. & Broome) Theiss. & Syd. (1915) = Malthomyces calamigenus, Phyllachoraceae
- P. chamaeropis (Cooke) Höhn. (1909) = Phaeochora steinheilii, Phaeochoraceae
- P. densa (E. Bommer & M. Rousseau) Theiss. & Syd. (1915) = Sphaerodothis densa, Phyllachoraceae
- P. guilielmae (Henn.) Theiss. & Syd. (1915) = Sphaerodothis guilielmae, Phyllachoraceae
- P. mauritiae (Mont.) Höhn. ex Theiss. & Syd. (1915) = Serenomyces mauritiae, Phaeochoraceae
- P. neowashingtoniae (Shear) Theiss. & Syd. (1915) = Phaeochoropsis neowashingtoniae, Phaeochoraceae
