= Trabutiella =

Trabutiella may refer to any of several biological genera or subgenera:

- Trabutiella Porsild, 1902 – a subgenus of the aquatic liverwort Riella
- Trabutiella Theiss. & Syd., 1914 – a synonym of Diatractium Syd. & P. Syd., a genus of fungus in the Ascomycota
- Trabutiella F. Stevens, 1920 – a genus of fungus in Phyllachoraceae family
