= Lohwagia =

Scientific classification
- Kingdom: Fungi
- Division: Ascomycota
- Class: Sordariomycetes
- Order: Phyllachorales
- Family: Phyllachoraceae
- Genus: Lohwagia; Petr. (1942)

Type species
- Lohwagia intermedia (Speg.) Petr. (1942)

Species
- L. intermedia L. kessleriana L. verruciformis

Genus of fungi

Lohwagia is a genus of fungi in the family Phyllachoraceae. The genus was described by Austrian-Czech mycologist Franz Petrak in 1942. Lohwagia contains three species: the type L. intermedia, L. kessleriana and L. verruciformis.

The genus name of Lohwagia is in honour of Heinrich Lohwag (1884–1945), who was an Austrian botanist (Mycology), cryptogamen researcher and teacher. He was also the father of botanist and mycologist Kurt Lohwag.

The genus was circumscribed in Bot. Arch. vol.43 on page 205 in 1942.
