= Phaeochoropsis mucosa =

Scientific classification
- Kingdom: Fungi
- Division: Ascomycota
- Class: Sordariomycetes
- Order: Phyllachorales
- Family: Phaeochoraceae
- Genus: Phaeochoropsis
- Species: P. mucosa

Binomial name
- Phaeochoropsis mucosa (Speg.) K.D. Hyde & P.F. Cannon, (1999)

Synonyms
- Catacauma mucosum (Speg.) Theiss. & Syd., Annls mycol. 13(3/4): 373 (1915); Phyllachora mucosa Speg., An. Soc. cient. argent. 26: 40 (1888)

Species of fungus

Phaeochoropsis mucosa is a plant pathogen infecting coconut trees. It causes lesions that are scattered over the tree leaves, although the necrosis is minimal.
