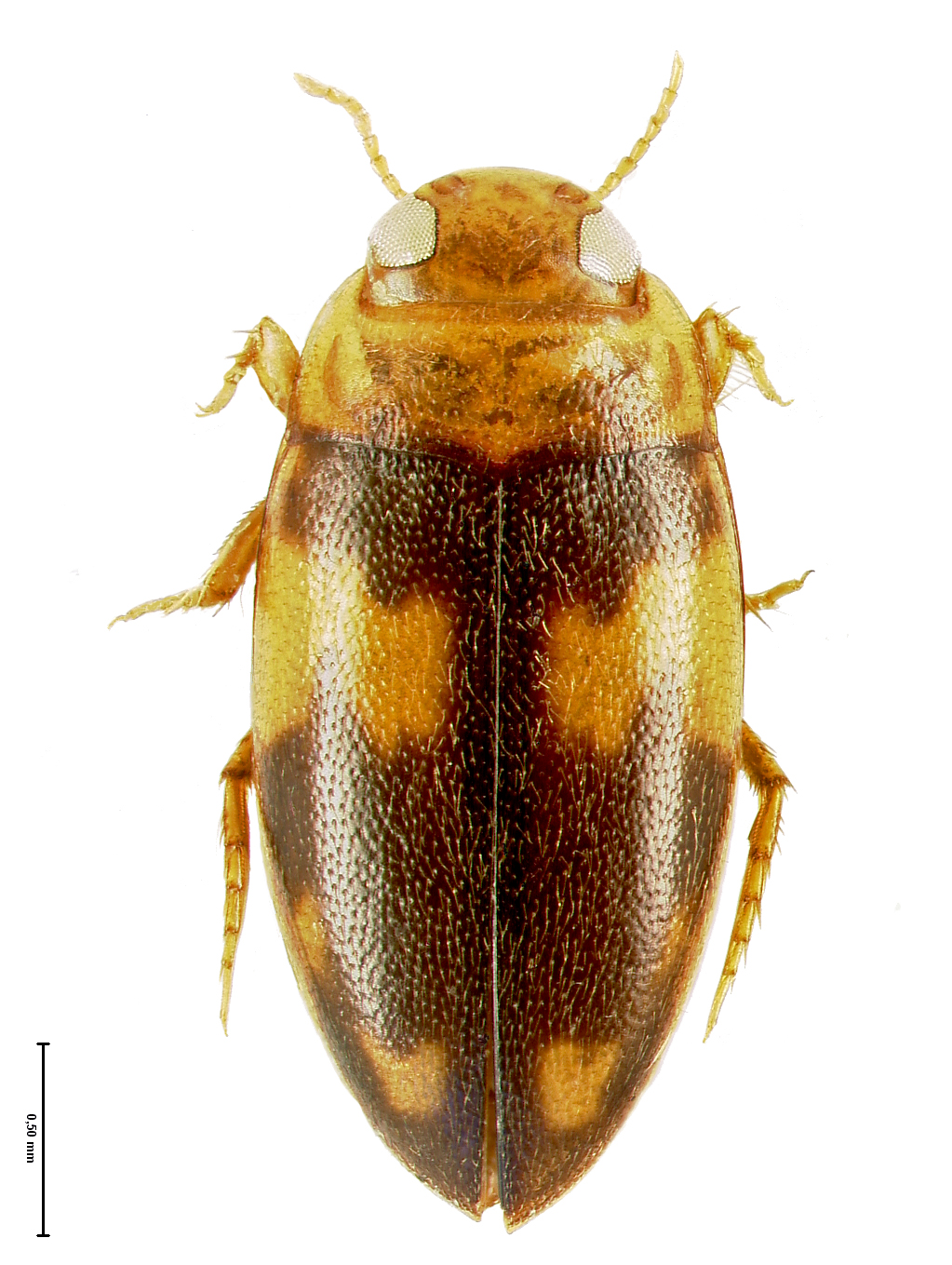

Scientific classification
- Domain: Eukaryota
- Kingdom: Animalia
- Phylum: Arthropoda
- Class: Insecta
- Order: Coleoptera
- Suborder: Adephaga
- Family: Dytiscidae
- Genus: Neobidessodes
- Species: N. flavosignatus

Binomial name
- Neobidessodes flavosignatus (Zimmermann, 1922)

Synonyms
- Bidessus flavosignatus Zimmermann, 1922; Bidessodes flavosignatus (Zimmermann, 1922)

= Neobidessodes flavosignatus =

Species of beetle

Neobidessodes flavosignatus is a carnivorous subterranean water beetle, in the Bidessini tribe of the Dytiscidae family. It was first described in 1922 by Albrecht Zimmermann as Bidessus flavosignatus. It was assigned to the genus Bidessodes by Watts in 1978, and to the new genus of Neobidessodes in 2009 by Hendrich and others.

It is found in the Northern Territory and Queensland.
