= Marinosphaera =

Scientific classification
- Kingdom: Fungi
- Division: Ascomycota
- Class: Sordariomycetes
- Order: Phyllachorales
- Family: Phyllachoraceae
- Genus: Marinosphaera; K.D. Hyde

Type species
- Marinosphaera mangrovei

Genus of fungi

Marinosphaera is a genus of fungi in the family Phyllachoraceae. This is a monotypic genus, containing the single species Marinosphaera mangrovei.
