= Serenomyces =

Scientific classification
- Kingdom: Fungi
- Division: Ascomycota
- Class: Sordariomycetes
- Order: Phyllachorales
- Family: Phyllachoraceae
- Genus: Serenomyces; Petr. 1952

Genus of fungi

Serenomyces is a genus of fungi within the family Phaeochoraceae.

== Species ==
As accepted by Species Fungorum;

- Serenomyces mauritiae (Mont.) K.D. Hyde & P.F. Cannon (1999)
- Serenomyces palmae E. Müll. (1965)
- Serenomyces phoenicis (Rolland) E. Müll. & S. Ahmad (1962)
- Serenomyces virginiae M.E. Barr, Ohr, Ferrin & Mundo-Ocampo (1997)

Former species;

- S. californicus M.E. Barr, Ohr & M.K. Murphy (1989) = Cocoicola californica, Phaeochoraceae
- S. shearii Petr. (1952) = Serenomyces mauritiae, Phaeochoraceae
