= Linochora graminis =

Scientific classification
- Kingdom: Fungi
- Division: Ascomycota
- Class: Sordariomycetes
- Order: Phyllachorales
- Family: Phyllachoraceae
- Genus: Linochora
- Species: L. graminis

Binomial name
- Linochora graminis (Grove) Parbery, (1967)

Synonyms
- Leptostromella graminis Grove 1937

Species of fungus

Linochora graminis is a fungal plant pathogen.
