= Heinrich Rehm =

German mycologist and lichenologist

Heinrich Simon Ludwig Friedrich Felix Rehm (20 October 1828, Ederheim – 1 April 1916, Munich) was a German mycologist and lichenologist. He studied at the University of Erlangen, the Ludwig-Maximilians-Universität München, and Heidelberg University, obtaining his medical doctorate in 1852. During his career, he was a practicing physician in Dietenhofen (from 1854), Sugenheim (from 1857), and Windsheim (from 1871). In 1875, he became regional medical examiner in Lohr am Main.

Starting with 1870 until his death, Rehm distributed fungal specimens in the well-known exsiccata series, Ascomyceten. First alone, later with Ferdinand Christian Gustav Arnold as co-editor he issued the lichen exsiccata Cladoniae exsiccatae (1869-1895).

== Publications (including published schedae of his exsiccata works) ==
- Rehm, H. 1874. Ascomyceten Fasc. 5: 201-250
- ----. 1875. Ascomyceten 6: 251-300
- ----. 1881, publ. 1882. Beiträge zur Ascomyceten-Flora der Deutschen Alpen und Voralpen. Hedwigia 20: 97-103
- ----. 1882. Beiträge zur Ascomyceten-Flora der Deutschen Alpen und Voralpen. Hedwigia 21 (8): 113–123.
- ----. 1883. Ascomyceten Fasc. XV: 701-750
- ----. 1883. Ascomycetes Lojkani Lecti in Hungaria, Transilvania et Galicia. [i-iv], [1]-70. Berlin; Friedländer & Sohn
- ----. 1883. Ascomyceten fasc. XIV. Hedwigia 22: 52-61
- ----. 1885. Ascomyceten fasc. XVI. Hedwigia 24: 7-17
- ----. 1885. Ascomyceten fasc. XVII. Hedwigia 24 (6): 225-246
- ----. 1888. Ascomyceten 923, in sched.
- ----. 1888. Ascomyceten fasc. XIX. Hedwigia 27: 163-175
- ----. 1889. Ascomyceten: Hysteriaceen und Discomyceten. Dr L. Rabenhorst's Kryptogamen-Flora von Deutschland, Oesterreich und der Schweiz Zweite Auflage. Vol. 1. 3. Abth: Ascomyceten: Hysteriaceen und Discomyceten. 209-336
- ----. 1889. Ascomyceten, Fasc. XX. Hedwigia 5: 347-358

== Eponyms ==
In 1861, the fungal genus Rehmia Kremp. 1861 was named after him by lichenologist August von Krempelhuber, it is now a synonym of Rhizocarpon. Other mycological genera that were named after him include; Rehmiella G.Winter 1883, Neorehmia Höhn. 1902 now Trichosphaerella, Rehmiellopsis Bubák & Kabát 1910 now Delphinella, Rehmiodothis Theissen & H.Sydow, 1914, Discorehmia Kirschst. 1936 and Rehmiomycella E.Müll. 1962.

== See also ==
- Category:Taxa named by Heinrich Rehm
