= Coccodiella =

Scientific classification
- Kingdom: Fungi
- Division: Ascomycota
- Class: Sordariomycetes
- Order: Phyllachorales
- Family: Phyllachoraceae
- Genus: Coccodiella; Hara

Type species
- Coccodiella arundinariae Hara

Genus of fungi

Coccodiella is a genus of fungi in the family Phyllachoraceae.

== Species ==
As accepted by Species Fungorum;

- Coccodiella advena (Syd. ex Chardón & Toro) I. Hino & Katum. (1968)
- Coccodiella andicola (Petr.) I. Hino & Katum. (1968)
- Coccodiella arundinariae Hara (1910)
- Coccodiella banksiae (Hansf.) H.J. Swart (1988)
- Coccodiella bullosa (Rehm) I. Hino & Katum. (1968)
- Coccodiella calatheae Mardones & M. Piepenbr. (2017)
- Coccodiella capparis (Mundk. & S. Ahmad) I. Hino & Katum. (1968)
- Coccodiella chamaedoreae (Syd.) I. Hino & Katum. (1968)
- Coccodiella depressa (Syd. & P. Syd.) I. Hino & Katum. (1968)
- Coccodiella leandrae (Syd. & P. Syd.) I. Hino & Katum. (1968)
- Coccodiella machaerii (Henn.) I. Hino & Katum. (1968)
- Coccodiella melastomatum (Lév.) I. Hino & Katum. (1968)
- Coccodiella miconiae (Duby) I. Hino & Katum. (1968)
- Coccodiella miconiicola (Garcés) I. Hino & Katum. (1968)
- Coccodiella minuta (Syd.) I. Hino & Katum. (1968)
- Coccodiella myrtacearum (Rick) I. Hino & Katum. (1968)
- Coccodiella neurophila (Theiss.) I. Hino & Katum. (1968)
- Coccodiella polymorpha (Lyon ex F. Stevens) I. Hino & Katum. (1968)
- Coccodiella puttemansii (Henn.) I. Hino & Katum. (1968)
- Coccodiella toledoi (Chardón) I. Hino & Katum. (1968)
- Coccodiella translucens (J.H. Mill. & Burton) I. Hino & Katum. (1968)

Former species;

- C. bactridis (Rehm) I. Hino & Katum. (1968) = Coccostromopsis diplothemii
- C. munkii (Speg.) Höhn. (1918) = Uleodothis munkii, Venturiaceae family
- C. nervisequens (Petr. & Cif.) I. Hino & Katum. (1968) = Coccostromopsis diplothemii
- C. nuda (F. Stevens) I. Hino & Katum. (1968) = Coccostroma nudum
- C. peribebuyensis (Speg.) I. Hino & Katum. (1968) = Coccostroma peribebuyense
- C. petrakii (Cif.) I. Hino & Katum. (1968) = Oxodeora petrakii
- C. symploci (T.S. Ramakr. & K. Ramakr.) A. Pande (2008) = Camarotella symploci
