= Trabutiella (fungus) =

Scientific classification
- Kingdom: Fungi
- Division: Ascomycota
- Class: Sordariomycetes
- Order: Phyllachorales
- Family: Phyllachoraceae
- Genus: Trabutiella; F.Stevens, 1920

Type species
- Trabutiella microthyrioides (Henn.) Theiss. & Syd. (1914)

Genus of fungi

Trabutiella is a genus of fungi in the family Phyllachoraceae.

The genus was circumscribed by Frank Lincoln Stevens in Bot. Gaz. vol. 70, p. 401, 1920.

The genus name of Trabutiella is in honour of Louis Charles Trabut (1853–1929), who was a French botanist and physician. He is remembered for his work involving the flora of Algeria and Tunisia.

It is similar in form to Trabutia (another Phyllachoraceae fungi), but with the asci 16-spored.

It was thought to be a synonym of Diatractium, but only one species had been transferred.

== Species ==
As accepted by Species Fungorum;

- Trabutiella ichnanthi (Speg.) Seaver & Chardón (1926)
- Trabutiella macrospora I. Hino & Katum. (1956)
- Trabutiella microthyrioides (Henn.) Theiss. & Syd. (1914)

Former species;

- T. congregata Syd. & P. Syd. (1917) = Parastigmatea congregata, Polystomellaceae
- T. cordiae F. Stevens (1920) = Diatractium cordianum, Phyllachoraceae
- T. diazii Chardón (1930) = Phyllachora conica, Phyllachoraceae
- T. filicina (Sacc. & Scalia) Theiss. & Syd. (1915) = Phyllachora filicina, Phyllachoraceae
