= Cocoicola =

Scientific classification
- Kingdom: Fungi
- Division: Ascomycota
- Class: Sordariomycetes
- Order: Phyllachorales
- Family: Phyllachoraceae
- Genus: Cocoicola; K.D. Hyde 1995

Genus of fungi

Cocoicola is a genus of fungi within the family Phaeochoraceae.

== Species ==
As accepted by Species Fungorum;

- Cocoicola californica (M.E. Barr, Ohr & M.K. Murphy) K.D. Hyde & P.F. Cannon (1999)
- Cocoicola cylindrospora (C. Booth & D.E. Shaw) K.D. Hyde (1995)
- Cocoicola fusispora (C. Booth & D.E. Shaw) K.D. Hyde (1995)
- Cocoicola livistonicola K.D. Hyde, J. Fröhl. & Joanne E. Taylor (1997)
- Cocoicola piperata K.D. Hyde & P.F. Cannon (1999)
