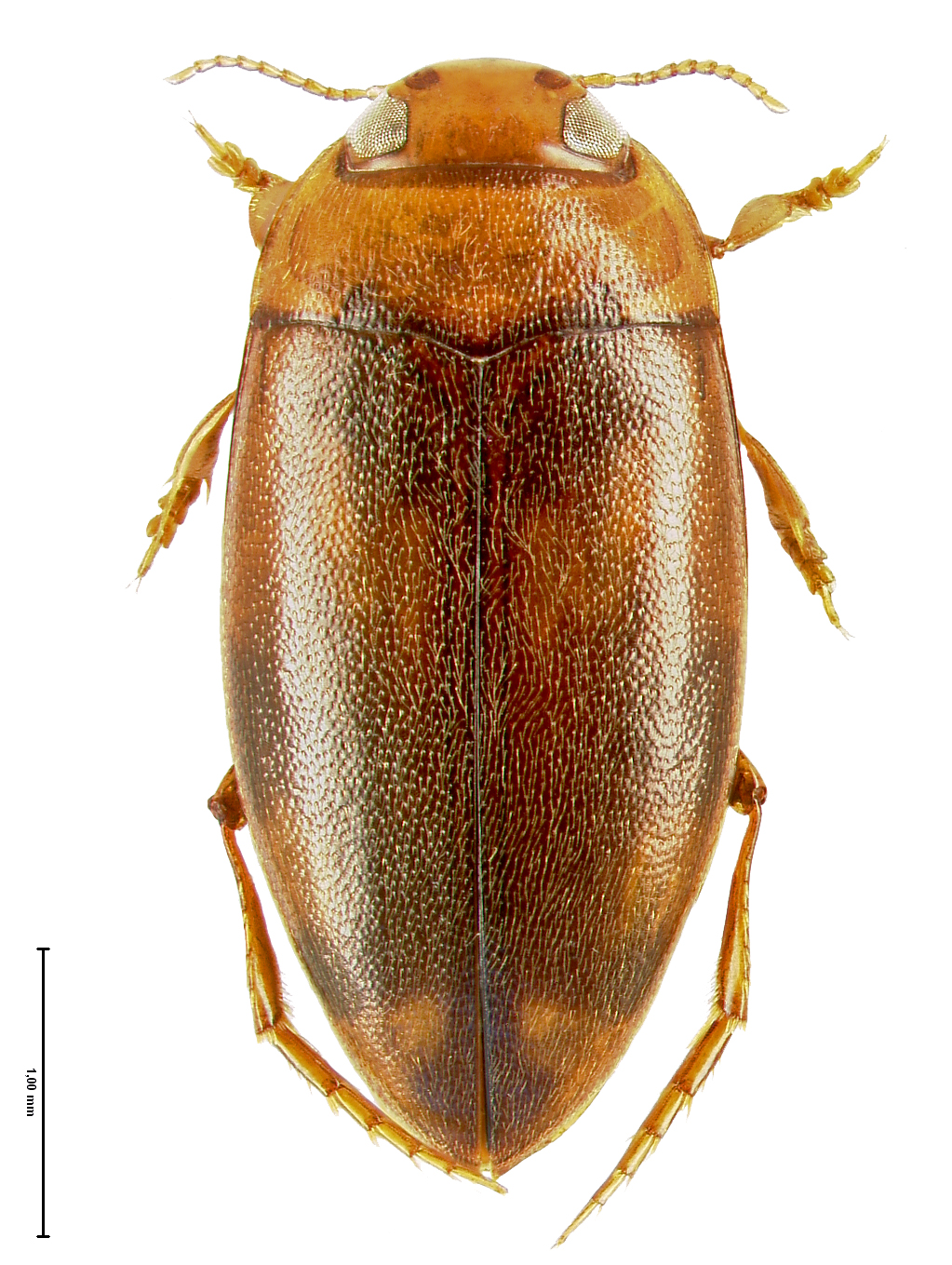

Scientific classification
- Domain: Eukaryota
- Kingdom: Animalia
- Phylum: Arthropoda
- Class: Insecta
- Order: Coleoptera
- Suborder: Adephaga
- Family: Dytiscidae
- Genus: Neobidessodes
- Species: N. grossus

Binomial name
- Neobidessodes grossus (Zimmermann, 1922)

Synonyms
- Bidessus grossus Zimmermann, 1922; Bidessodes grossus (Zimmermann, 1922)

= Neobidessodes grossus =

Species of beetle

Neobidessodes grossus is a carnivorous subterranean water beetle, in the Bidessini tribe of the Dytiscidae family. It was first described in 1922 by Albrecht Zimmermann as Bidessus grossus. It was assigned to the genus Bidessodes by Watts in 1978, and to the new genus of Neobidessodes in 2009 by Hendrich and others.

It is found in Queensland.
