= Louis Charles Trabut =

French botanist

- Born: July 12, 1853; Chambéry, France
- Died: April 25, 1929 (aged 75); Algeria
- Known for: Research on the flora of Algeria and Tunisia
- Scientific career
- Fields: Botany, medicine
- Institutions: University of Algiers
- Author abbrev. (botany): Trab.

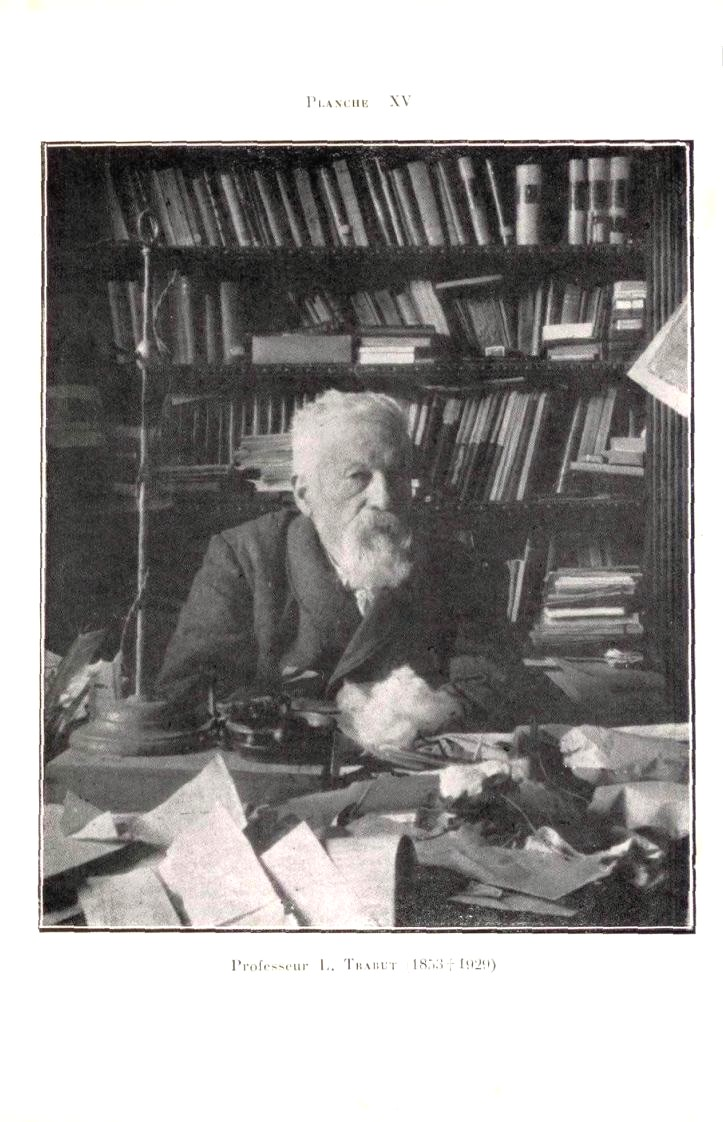
Louis Charles Trabut (1853–1929)

Louis Charles Trabut (12 July 1853 – 25 April 1929) was a French botanist and physician who was a native of Chambéry, department of Savoie. He is remembered for his work involving the flora of Algeria and Tunisia.

Trabut was a professor of natural history at the Faculty of Medicine and Pharmacy of Algiers, and also a consultant physician to the Mustapha Pacha hospital. With botanist Jules Aimé Battandier (1848–1922), he published several works on Algerian flora, that included the following:

- Flore de l'Algérie (Flora of Algeria) (1888–90).
- L'Algérie, le sol et les habitants, flore, faune, geologie, anthropologie, ressources agricoles et économiques (Algeria, the land and its people, Flora, fauna, geology, anthropology, agricultural resources and economics) (1898).
- Flore analytique et synoptique de l'Algérie et de la Tunisie (Flora analytic and synoptic of Algeria and Tunisia) (1905).

== Honours ==
In 1881, mycologists Pier Andrea Saccardo and Casimir Roumeguère published a fungal genus (in the family Phyllachoraceae), Trabutia, which was named after Trabut. In 1920, F.Stevens published Trabutiella, also in the family Phyllachoraceae. Lastly, Joanne E.Taylor, K.D.Hyde & E.B.G.Jones in 2003 published Tribulatia which is a monotypic genus of fungi in the family Phyllachoraceae.

He also has several plant species named after him, such as the eucalyptus species Eucalyptus trabutii.
