= Retroa =

Scientific classification
- Kingdom: Fungi
- Division: Ascomycota
- Class: Sordariomycetes
- Order: Phyllachorales
- Family: Phyllachoraceae
- Genus: Retroa; P.F. Cannon

Type species
- Retroa dimorphandrae (F. Stevens) P.F. Cannon

Genus of fungi

Retroa is a genus of fungi in the family Phyllachoraceae.
