= Telimenella =

Scientific classification
- Domain: Eukaryota
- Kingdom: Fungi
- Division: Ascomycota
- Class: Sordariomycetes
- Order: Phyllachorales
- Family: Phyllachoraceae
- Genus: Telimenella; Petr.

Type species
- Telimenella persica Petr.

Genus of fungi

Telimenella is a genus of fungi in the family Phyllachoraceae.

== Species ==
As accepted by Species Fungorum;

- Telimenella gangraena (Fr.) Petr. (1947)
- Telimenella phacidioidea M.E. Barr (1977)

Former species; T. persica Petr. (1940) = Telimenella gangraena
