= Malthomyces =

Scientific classification
- Kingdom: Fungi
- Division: Ascomycota
- Class: Sordariomycetes
- Order: Phyllachorales
- Family: Phyllachoraceae
- Genus: Malthomyces; D. Hyde & P.F. Cannon

Type species
- Malthomyces calamigena (Berk. & Broome) K.D. Hyde & P.F. Cannon

Genus of fungi

Malthomyces is a genus of fungi in the family Phyllachoraceae.
