= Crambella =

Scientific classification
- Kingdom: Plantae
- Clade: Tracheophytes
- Clade: Angiosperms
- Clade: Eudicots
- Clade: Rosids
- Order: Brassicales
- Family: Brassicaceae
- Genus: Crambella; Maire
- Species: C. teretifolia

Binomial name
- Crambella teretifolia (Batt. & Trab.) Maire

Synonyms
- Crambe teretifolia Batt. & Trab.

Genus of flowering plants

Crambella is a genus of flowering plants belonging to the family Brassicaceae. It includes a single species, Crambella teretifolia, which is endemic to Morocco.
