= Stromaster =

Scientific classification
- Kingdom: Fungi
- Division: Ascomycota
- Class: Sordariomycetes
- Order: Phyllachorales
- Family: Phyllachoraceae
- Genus: Stromaster; Höhn.

Type species
- Stromaster tuberculatus (Pat.) Höhn.

Genus of fungi

Stromaster is a genus of fungi in the family Phyllachoraceae. This is a monotypic genus, containing the single species Stromaster tuberculatus.
