= Diachora =

Scientific classification
- Kingdom: Fungi
- Division: Ascomycota
- Class: Sordariomycetes
- Order: Phyllachorales
- Family: Phyllachoraceae
- Genus: Diachora; Arg.

Type species
- Diachora onobrychidis (DC.) Jul. Müll.

Genus of fungi

Diachora is a genus of fungi in the family Phyllachoraceae.

== Distribution ==
It has been found in Europe and Asia.

== Species ==
As accepted by Species Fungorum;

- Diachora erebia (Syd. & P. Syd.) P.F. Cannon (1991)
- Diachora fennica (Lind) E. Müll. (1986)
- Diachora lathyri (Lév.) E. Müll. (1986)
- Diachora onobrychidis (DC.) Jul. Müll. (1893)

Former species;

- D. barnadesiae (Syd.) Petr. (1950) = Phyllachora barnadesiae
- D. lespedezae E. Müll. (1986) = Vitreostroma desmodii
- D. lessertiae (Doidge) Petr. (1934) = Stigmatula sutherlandiae, Phyllachoraceae
