= Isothea =

Scientific classification
- Kingdom: Fungi
- Division: Ascomycota
- Class: Sordariomycetes
- Order: Phyllachorales
- Family: Phyllachoraceae
- Genus: Isothea; Fr. (1849)

Type species
- Isothea rhytismoides (Bab. ex Berk.) Fr. (1849)

Species
- I. chilensis I. imazekii I. nyssae I. rhytismoides

Genus of fungi

Isothea is a genus of fungi in the family Phyllachoraceae.
