= Vitreostroma =

Scientific classification
- Kingdom: Fungi
- Division: Ascomycota
- Class: Sordariomycetes
- Order: Phyllachorales
- Family: Phyllachoraceae
- Genus: Vitreostroma; P.F. Cannon

Type species
- Vitreostroma desmodii (Henn.) P.F. Cannon

Synonyms
- Phyllachora desmodii Henn., in Engler, Pflanzenw. Ost-Afrikas Nachbarg., Teil C: 34 (1895); Diachora lespedezae E. Müll., Trans. Bot. Soc. Edinb., 150th anniversary supplement: 73 (1986)

Genus of fungi

Vitreostroma is a monotypic genus of fungi in the family Phyllachoraceae. It was listed in Outline of fungi in 2020 as having 3 known species.

But only 1 species is listed as accepted by Species Fungorum; Vitreostroma desmodii (Henn.) P.F. Cannon (1991). As Vitreostroma desmodii subsp. asiaticum P.F. Cannon (1991) and Vitreostroma desmodii subsp. lespedezae (E. Müll.) P.F. Cannon (1991) are demeaned synonyms of Vitreostroma desmodii.
