= Imazekia =

Scientific classification
- Kingdom: Fungi
- Division: Ascomycota
- Class: Sordariomycetes
- Order: Phyllachorales
- Family: Phyllachoraceae
- Genus: Imazekia; Tak. Kobay. & Y. Kawabe

Type species
- Imazekia ryukyuensis Tak. Kobay. & Y. Kawabe

Genus of fungi

Imazekia is a genus of fungi in the family Phyllachoraceae. This is a monotypic genus, containing the single species Imazekia ryukyuensis.
