= Tribulatia =

Scientific classification
- Kingdom: Fungi
- Division: Ascomycota
- Class: Sordariomycetes
- Order: Phyllachorales
- Family: Phyllachoraceae
- Genus: Tribulatia; J.E.Taylor, K.D.Hyde & E.B.G.Jones

Type species
- Tribulatia appendicospora Joanne E.Taylor, K.D.Hyde & E.B.G.Jones

Genus of fungi

Tribulatia is a genus of fungi in the family Phyllachoraceae. This is a monotypic genus, containing the single species Tribulatia appendicospora.

The genus name of Tribulatia is in honour of Louis Charles Trabut (1853–1929), who was a French botanist and physician. He is remembered for his work involving the flora of Algeria and Tunisia.
