= Apiosphaeria =

Scientific classification
- Kingdom: Fungi
- Division: Ascomycota
- Class: Sordariomycetes
- Order: Phyllachorales
- Family: Phyllachoraceae
- Genus: Apiosphaeria; Höhn.

Type species
- Apiosphaeria guaranitica (Speg.) Höhn.

Genus of fungi

Apiosphaeria is a genus of fungi in the family Phyllachoraceae.
