= Phyllocrea =

Scientific classification
- Kingdom: Fungi
- Division: Ascomycota
- Class: Sordariomycetes
- Order: Phyllachorales
- Family: Phyllachoraceae
- Genus: Phyllocrea; Höhn.

Type species
- Phyllocrea quitensis (Pat.) Höhn.

Genus of fungi

Phyllocrea is a genus of fungi in the family Phyllachoraceae.
