= Orphnodactylis =

Scientific classification
- Kingdom: Fungi
- Division: Ascomycota
- Class: Sordariomycetes
- Order: Phyllachorales
- Family: Phyllachoraceae
- Genus: Orphnodactylis; Malloch & Mallik

Genus of fungi

Orphnodactylis is a genus of fungi in the family Phyllachoraceae.

== Species ==
As accepted by Species Fungorum;

- Orphnodactylis kalmiae Malloch & A. Mallik (1998)
- Orphnodactylis wittrockii (Erikss.) Malloch & Mallik (1998)
