= Fremitomyces =

Scientific classification
- Kingdom: Fungi
- Division: Ascomycota
- Class: Sordariomycetes
- Order: Phyllachorales
- Family: Phyllachoraceae
- Genus: Fremitomyces; P.F. Cannon & H.C. Evans

Type species
- Fremitomyces punctatus P.F. Cannon & H.C. Evans

Genus of fungi

Fremitomyces is a genus of fungi in the family Phyllachoraceae.

== Species ==
As accepted by Species Fungorum;

- Fremitomyces mahe P.F. Cannon & H.C. Evans (1999)
- Fremitomyces punctatus P.F. Cannon & H.C. Evans (1999)
