= Phylleutypa =

Scientific classification
- Kingdom: Fungi
- Division: Ascomycota
- Class: Sordariomycetes
- Order: Phyllachorales
- Family: Phyllachoraceae
- Genus: Phylleutypa; Petr.

Type species
- Phylleutypa dioscoreae (Wakef.) Petr.

Genus of fungi

Phylleutypa is a genus of fungi in the family Phyllachoraceae.
