= Geminispora =

Scientific classification
- Kingdom: Fungi
- Division: Ascomycota
- Class: Sordariomycetes
- Order: Phyllachorales
- Family: Phyllachoraceae
- Genus: Geminispora; Pat.

Type species
- Geminispora mimosae Pat.

Genus of fungi

Geminispora is a genus of fungi in the family Phyllachoraceae; according to the 2007 Outline of Ascomycota, the placement in this family is uncertain.

== Distribution ==
It is only recorded as being found in the Caribbean and South America.

== Species ==
As accepted by Species Fungorum;

- Geminispora derridis (Syd. & P. Syd.) P.F. Cannon (1991)
- Geminispora mimosae Pat. (1893)
