= Petrakiella =

Scientific classification
- Kingdom: Fungi
- Division: Ascomycota
- Class: Sordariomycetes
- Order: Phyllachorales
- Family: Phyllachoraceae
- Genus: Petrakiella; Syd.

Type species
- Petrakiella insignis Syd.

Genus of fungi

Petrakiella is a genus of fungi in the family Phyllachoraceae; according to the 2007 Outline of Ascomycota, the placement in this family is uncertain. This is a monotypic genus, containing the single species Petrakiella insignis.

The genus name of Petrakiella is in honour of Franz Petrak (1886–1973), who was an Austrian-Czech mycologist.

The genus was circumscribed by Hans Sydow in Ann. Mycol. vol.22 on page 230 in 1924.
