= Zimmermanniella =

Scientific classification
- Kingdom: Fungi
- Division: Ascomycota
- Class: Sordariomycetes
- Order: Phyllachorales
- Family: Phyllachoraceae
- Genus: Zimmermanniella; P. Henn.

Type species
- Zimmermanniella trispora Henn.

Genus of fungi

Zimmermanniella is a genus of fungi in the family Phyllachoraceae. This is a monotypic genus, containing the single species Zimmermanniella trispora Henn.

The genus and species were circumscribed by Paul Christoph Hennings in Hedwigia vol.41 on page 142 in 1902.

The genus name of Zimmermanniella is in honour of Albrecht Wilhelm Philipp Zimmermann (1860–1931), who was a German botanist.
