= Sphaerodothella =

Scientific classification
- Kingdom: Fungi
- Division: Ascomycota
- Class: Sordariomycetes
- Order: Phyllachorales
- Family: Phyllachoraceae
- Genus: Sphaerodothella; C.A. Pearce & K.D. Hyde

Type species
- Sphaerodothella danthoniae (McAlpine) C.A. Pearce & K.D. Hyde

Genus of fungi

Sphaerodothella is a genus of sac fungi in the family Phyllachoraceae. This is a monotypic genus, containing the single species Sphaerodothella danthoniae. It is found solely on species of grass in the genus Rytidosperma (which were formerly placed Danthonia). It was originally described in 1902 by Australian mycologist Daniel McAlpine as Anthostomella danthoniae.

== Identification ==
Sphaerodothella danthoniae used to be considered part of the genus Sphaerodothis, until it was moved to its own genus in 2001. It differs from Sphaerodothis in having a hyaline to brown peridium composed of thin-walled, flattened fungal cells which merge with the cells of their Rytidosperma hosts, and pale brown ascospores which have a distinctive dark brown mucilaginous perisporium.

It produces black, shiny leaf spots that occasionally coalesce into straight to irregular lines in the leaf surface of Rytidosperma.

== Distribution ==
Sphaerodothella danthoniae is indigenous to Australia and New Zealand. In New Zealand it was previously recorded as Sphaerodothis magnifica and as S. calospora.

The type specimen was collected in 1899 at Ardmona, Victoria, Australia.

== Ecology ==
S. danthoniae was described by McAlpine as a "true and desctructive parasite" on its type host Rytidosperma penicillatum. It grows on living leaves, sometimes turning them crispy and black. To date, it has been found entirely on species in the genus Rytidosperma.

=== Hosts of S. danthoniae ===
Today, S. danthoniae has been recorded parasitising on all of the following species:

- Rytidosperma australe (Petrie) Connor & Edgar
- Rytidosperma bipartitum (Link) A.M. Humphreys & H.P.Linder
- Rytidosperma caespitosum (Gaudich.) Connor & Edgar
- Rytidosperma gracile (Hook.f.) Connor & Edgar
- Rytidosperma maculatum (Zotov) Connor & Edgar
- Rytidosperma penicillatum (Labill.) Connor & Edgar
- Rytidosperma pilosum (R.Br.) Connor & Edgar
- Rytidosperma racemosum (R.Br.) Connor & Edgar
- Rytidosperma richardsonii (Cashmore) Connor & Edgar
- Rytidosperma unarede (Raoul) Connor et Edgar

== Taxonomy ==
It was originally described in 1902 by Australian mycologist Daniel McAlpine as Anthostomella danthoniae. Following this, the names Sphaerodothis calospora and Sphaerodothis magnifica were applied to it from specimens collected in New Zealand, both of which are now viewed as synonyms. In 1977, it was moved to Sphaerodothis as S. danthoniae. Finally, it was moved to its own genus as Sphaerodothella danthoniae.
