= Schizochora =

Scientific classification
- Domain: Eukaryota
- Kingdom: Fungi
- Division: Ascomycota
- Class: Sordariomycetes
- Order: Phyllachorales
- Family: Phyllachoraceae
- Genus: Schizochora; Syd. & P. Syd.

Type species
- Schizochora elmeri Syd. & P. Syd.

Genus of fungi

Schizochora is a genus of fungi in the family Phyllachoraceae.
