= Pterosporidium =

Scientific classification
- Kingdom: Fungi
- Division: Ascomycota
- Class: Sordariomycetes
- Order: Phyllachorales
- Family: Phyllachoraceae
- Genus: Pterosporidium; W.H. Ho & K.D. Hyde

Type species
- Pterosporidium rhizophorae (Vizioli) W.H. Ho & K.D. Hyde

Genus of fungi

Pterosporidium is a genus of fungi in the Phyllachoraceae family. The genus contain two widely distributed species that grow on mangrove leaves.
