= Ophiodothella =

Scientific classification
- Kingdom: Fungi
- Division: Ascomycota
- Class: Sordariomycetes
- Order: Phyllachorales
- Family: Phyllachoraceae
- Genus: Ophiodothella (P. Henn.) Höhn.

Type species
- Ophiodothella atromaculans (Henn.) Höhn.

Genus of fungi

Ophiodothella is a genus of fungi in the family Phyllachoraceae.

== Distribution ==
It has a cosmopolitan distribution, found in the North and South America, Asia and Australia.

== Species ==
As accepted by Species Fungorum;

- Ophiodothella angustissima (Peck) Hanlin & M.C. González (2013)
- Ophiodothella arengae W.H. Hsieh, Chi Y. Chen & Sivan. (1997)
- Ophiodothella atromaculans (Henn.) Höhn. (1910)
- Ophiodothella balansae (Speg.) Höhn. (1910)
- Ophiodothella bignoniacearum Chardón (1940)
- Ophiodothella calami Hosag. (1994)
- Ophiodothella calamicola (T.S. Ramakr. & K. Ramakr.) K.D. Hyde & P.F. Cannon (1999)
- Ophiodothella caseariae Hanlin, M.C. González, Tortolero & Renaud (2002)
- Ophiodothella cuervoi Chardón (1934)
- Ophiodothella cyclobalanopsidis W.H. Hsieh, Chi Y. Chen & Sivan. (1998)
- Ophiodothella edax (Berk. & Broome) Höhn. (1910)
- Ophiodothella ferruginea (Ellis & G. Martin) M.E. Barr (1978)
- Ophiodothella fici E.A. Bessey (1919)
- Ophiodothella floridana Chardón (1929)
- Ophiodothella galophila Syd. (1925)
- Ophiodothella lagerstroemiae Hosag. & N.C. Nair (1986)
- Ophiodothella leptospora (Speg.) Höhn. (1910)
- Ophiodothella leucospila (Berk. & M.A. Curtis) J.H. Mill. & G.E. Thomps. (1940)
- Ophiodothella liebenbergii Doidge (1942)
- Ophiodothella longispora H.J. Swart (1982)
- Ophiodothella neurophila Syd. (1931)
- Ophiodothella orchidearum E.K. Cash & A.M.J. Watson (1955)
- Ophiodothella palmicola Bat. & Peres (1960)
- Ophiodothella panamensis F. Stevens (1927)
- Ophiodothella paraguariensis (Speg.) Höhn. (1910)
- Ophiodothella ruprechtiae (Speg.) Catania & A.I. Romero (2019)
- Ophiodothella sydowii Petr. (1948)
- Ophiodothella syzygii C.A. Pearce & K.D. Hyde (1993)
- Ophiodothella tithoniae Chardón (1934)
- Ophiodothella trichocarpa Syd. (1925)
- Ophiodothella ulei (Rehm) Höhn. (1910)

Former species;

- O. circularis (Bres. ex Theiss. & Syd.) Petr. (1951) = Ophiodothella calamicola
- O. ingae (Henn.) Theiss. & Syd. (1915) = Diatractium ingae
- O. tarda (Harkn.) Höhn. (1910) = Sphaerulina tarda
- O. vaccinii Boyd (1934) = Ophiodothella angustissima
