= Stigmochora =

Scientific classification
- Domain: Eukaryota
- Kingdom: Fungi
- Division: Ascomycota
- Class: Sordariomycetes
- Order: Phyllachorales
- Family: Phyllachoraceae
- Genus: Stigmochora; Theiss. & Syd.

Type species
- Stigmochora controversa (Starbäck) Theiss. & Syd.

Genus of fungi

Stigmochora is a genus of fungi in the family Phyllachoraceae.

== Distribution ==
It has been found in South America and Africa.

== Species ==
As accepted by Species Fungorum;

- Stigmochora albiziae (Syd. & P. Syd.) Arx (1962)
- Stigmochora chloroxyli R.C. Rajak & A.K. Pandey (1986)
- Stigmochora controversa (Starbäck) Theiss. & Syd. (1914)
- Stigmochora deightonii (Syd.) Arx (1962)
- Stigmochora natalensis (Doidge) Arx (1962)
- Stigmochora parkiae (Henn.) Arx (1962)
- Stigmochora simaroubae Bat. & Peres (1965)
- Stigmochora ulei Syd. & P. Syd. (1916)
- Stigmochora variegata M.E. Barr & Hodges (1987)

Former species;

- S. confertissima (Fuckel) Höhn. (1920) = Venturia geranii, Venturiaceae
- S. leucothoes (Cooke) Höhn. (1918) = Pseudomassaria leucothoes, Pseudomassariaceae
- S. tetraspora (Orton) J.A. Stev. (1975) = Endodothella tetraspora, Phyllachoraceae
