= Fezia =

Scientific classification
- Kingdom: Plantae
- Clade: Tracheophytes
- Clade: Angiosperms
- Clade: Eudicots
- Clade: Rosids
- Order: Brassicales
- Family: Brassicaceae
- Genus: Fezia; Pit. ex Batt.
- Species: F. pterocarpa

Binomial name
- Fezia pterocarpa Pit.

Synonyms
- Cordylocarpus pumilus Sennen & Mauricio ex Maire

Genus of flowering plants

Fezia is a genus of flowering plants belonging to the family Brassicaceae. It includes a single species, Fezia pterocarpa, which is endemic to Morocco.
