= Brobdingnagia =

Scientific classification
- Kingdom: Fungi
- Division: Ascomycota
- Class: Sordariomycetes
- Order: Phyllachorales
- Family: Phyllachoraceae
- Genus: Brobdingnagia; D. Hyde & P.F. Cannon

Type species
- Brobdingnagia nigeriensis (Sivan. & Okpala) K.D. Hyde & P.F. Cannon

Genus of fungi

Brobdingnagia is a genus of fungi in the family Phyllachoraceae.
