= Parberya =

Scientific classification
- Domain: Eukaryota
- Kingdom: Fungi
- Division: Ascomycota
- Class: Sordariomycetes
- Order: Phyllachorales
- Family: Phyllachoraceae
- Genus: Parberya; C.A. Pearce & K.D. Hyde

Type species
- Parberya kosciuskoa C.A. Pearce & K.D. Hyde

Genus of fungi

Parberya is a genus of fungi in the family Phyllachoraceae.
