= Telimenochora =

Scientific classification
- Kingdom: Fungi
- Division: Ascomycota
- Class: Sordariomycetes
- Order: Phyllachorales
- Family: Phyllachoraceae
- Genus: Telimenochora; Sivan.

Type species
- Telimenochora abortiva (F. Stevens) Sivan.

Genus of fungi

Telimenochora is a genus of fungi in the family Phyllachoraceae. This is a monotypic genus, containing the single species Telimenochora abortiva.
