= Pseudothiella =

Scientific classification
- Kingdom: Fungi
- Division: Ascomycota
- Class: Sordariomycetes
- Order: Phyllachorales
- Family: Phyllachoraceae
- Genus: Pseudothiella; Petr.

Type species
- Pseudothiella hirtellae (Henn.) Petr.

Genus of fungi

Pseudothiella is a genus of fungi in the family Phyllachoraceae. This is a monotypic genus, containing the single species Pseudothiella hirtellae.
