= Phaeochorella =

Scientific classification
- Kingdom: Fungi
- Division: Ascomycota
- Class: Sordariomycetes
- Order: Phyllachorales
- Family: Phyllachoraceae
- Genus: Phaeochorella; Theiss. & Syd.

Type species
- Phaeochorella parinarii (Henn.) Theiss. & Syd.

Genus of fungi

Phaeochorella is a genus of fungi It was formerly placed in the family Phyllachoraceae, before in 2020 placed in the monotypic family of Phaeochorellaceae.

== Species ==
As accepted by Species Fungorum;

- Phaeochorella artocarpi T.S. Ramakr. & K. Ramakr. (1948)
- Phaeochorella ciliata Bat. & J.L. Bezerra (1961)
- Phaeochorella clypeata (G. Winter) Theiss. & Syd. (1915)
- Phaeochorella machaerii Bat. & Peres (1960)
- Phaeochorella parinarii (Henn.) Theiss. & Syd. (1915)
- Phaeochorella zonata Petr. (1947)

Former species; P. sphaerospora Chardón (1930) = Phyllachora conica
