= Emil Müller (mycologist) =

Swiss mycologist (1920–2008)

Emil Müller (5 March 1920 – 2 April 2008) was a Swiss mycologist. He specialised in the study of the systematics of the ascomycetes, particularly grass-inhabiting species. Müller significantly contributed to mycological taxonomy and published more than 200 peer-reviewed scientific articles during his career.

== Early life and education ==
Müller was born on 5 March 1920 in Zürich, Switzerland. His passion for natural history guided him to study agricultural sciences at the Swiss Federal Institute of Technology (ETH) in Zürich, where he graduated in 1944. Müller initially worked at the Plantahof Agricultural School in Landquart, where his fascination with fungi, particularly grass-inhabiting ascomycetes, began. Under the mentorship of mycologist Ernst Gäumann, Müller undertook taxonomic and ecological studies of the fungal genus Leptosphaeria, earning his doctorate in 1949. His dissertation, completed in under 18 months, was honoured with a silver medal from ETH Zürich. During this period, Müller worked closely with fellow student J.A. von Arx, who provided direct supervision for part of Müller's doctoral research. Müller and von Arx also spent time with Franz Petrak, who further encouraged their shared interest in ascomycetous fungi.

== Career ==
Following his doctorate, Müller spent four years at the Reckenholz Federal Research Station in Zürich, publishing 16 papers focused on ascomycete taxonomy. In 1954, he was appointed curator of the herbaria at ETH Zürich, enabling him to concentrate fully on taxonomic research. Müller's career includes publications co-authored with colleague Josef Adolf von Arx, particularly the seminal works Die Gattungen der amerosporen Pyrenomyceten (Genera of the amerosporous Pyrenomycetes, 1954) and Die Gattungen der didymosporen Pyrenomyceten (Genera of the didymosporous Pyrenomycetes, 1962). These books are regarded as foundational texts in modern ascomycete taxonomy, detailing numerous genera and providing extensive species descriptions and illustrations. Their collaboration advanced the taxonomy of pyrenomycetous fungi, providing essential hypotheses that underpin contemporary molecular phylogenetics studies, particularly through their influential 1975 publication on bitunicate ascomycetes.

Müller also co-authored the influential reference book Mykologie (Mycology) with Wolfgang Löffler, initially published in German in 1968 and subsequently translated into English, Polish, and Spanish. His contributions to mycology were internationally recognised; he was appointed a corresponding member of the Mycological Society of America and elected an honorary member of the British Mycological Society, both in 1982.

== Editorship of Sydowia ==
In 1973, Müller took over the editorship of the international mycology journal Sydowia following the death of its founder, Franz Petrak. At the time, the journal's scientific credibility had deteriorated due to Petrak's disregard for rigorous peer-review standards. Müller successfully restored the journal's academic reputation and remained active on the editorial board nearly until his retirement.

== Teaching and alpine research ==
At ETH Zürich, Müller taught mycology initially as a lecturer, later becoming associate professor in 1970 and full professor in 1973, until his retirement in 1987. He was highly respected for his field excursions, particularly in the Swiss Alps of the Canton Graubünden, where he conducted research on alpine fungi. Though illness prevented the completion of his comprehensive work on alpine ascomycetes, Müller’s knowledge of alpine flora, fauna, geology, and local history greatly enriched his students' educational experiences.

== Legacy and honours ==
Müller died on 2 April 2008. He was remembered by colleagues and students alike not only for his scientific achievements but also for his generosity and approachable nature. The fungal genera Muellerites and Muelleromyces were named in his honour, recognising his contributions to mycology.

== Selected publications ==
- Müller, E.; von Arx, J.A. (1962). Die Gattungen der didymosphoren Pyrenomyceten [The genera of didymosporous pyrenomycetes]. Beiträge zur Kryptogamenflora der Schweiz (in German). Vol. 11. pp. 1–922.
- Muller, E. (1971). "13. Imperfect-Perfect Connections in Ascomycetes". Taxonomy of Fungi Imperfecti. University of Toronto Press. pp. 184–201. doi:10.3138/9781487589165-015. ISBN 978-1-4875-8916-5.
- Müller, Emil; Loeffler, Wolfgang (1976). Mycology: An Outline for Science and Medical Students. Stuttgart: Thieme. ISBN 3-13-514101-2.
- Müller, Emil; Magnuson, J. A. (1987). "On the Origin and Ecology of Alpine Plant Parasitic Fungi". Arctic and Alpine Mycology II. Boston, MA: Springer US. p. 3–16. doi:10.1007/978-1-4757-1939-0_2. ISBN 978-1-4757-1941-3.

== See also ==
- List of mycologists
