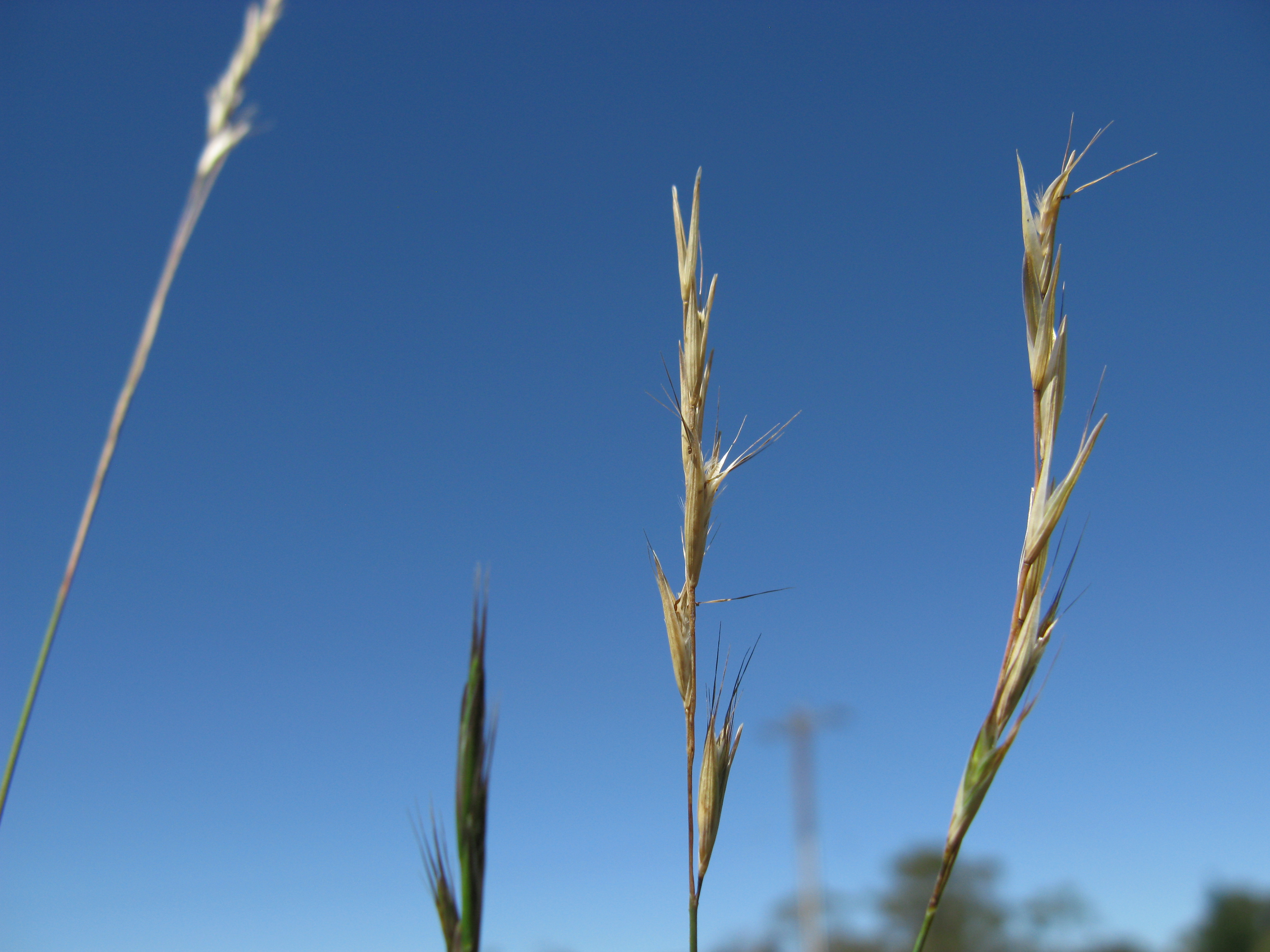

Scientific classification
- Kingdom: Plantae
- Clade: Tracheophytes
- Clade: Angiosperms
- Clade: Monocots
- Clade: Commelinids
- Order: Poales
- Family: Poaceae
- Genus: Rytidosperma
- Species: R. racemosum

Binomial name
- Rytidosperma racemosum (R.Br.) Connor & Edgar

Synonyms
- Austrodanthonia racemosa (R.Br.) H.P.Linder; Danthonia racemosa (R.Br.); Notodanthonia racemosa Zotov

= Rytidosperma racemosum =

Species of grass

Rytidosperma racemosum or wallaby grass, is a species of grass endemic to eastern Australia, but naturalised in New Zealand, Hawaii (USA), and California (USA). It was described as Danthonia racemosa in 1810 by Scottish botanist Robert Brown. Two varieties are recognized:

- Rytidosperma racemosum var. racemosum
- Rytidosperma racemosum var. obtusatum

== Distribution ==
=== Exotic range ===
R. racemosum naturalised in New Zealand by 1879, and is now found throughout the North and South Islands, as well as Raoul and Macauley Islands in the Kermadecs, and Three Kings Island near Northland. In the North Island it is found throughout except in Taranaki. In the South Island it is found in Nelson, Marlborough, coastal Canterbury to Rakaia River, basins of inland Otago, and near Dunedin.

In California, R. racemosum was grown experimentally in several places in near Berkeley, where it has established and spread to nearby areas of the Bay Area.

R. racemosum var. racemosum was identified as naturalized on Maui and Hawai‘i for the first time in 2025 and is known from western Haleakalā, Mauna Kea, and Mauna Loa. It has previously been confused with Rytidosperma penicillatum. It may have arrived within 12 accessions of Rytidosperma imported by the Hawaii Agricultural Experiment Station (HAES) from 1913–1937, or in seeds imported accidentally with hay.

== Ecology ==
The rust fungus Uromyces danthoniae, a species found that grows parasitically on the leaves of several Rytidosperma species in New Zealand and Australia, infects Rytidosperma racemosum. It forms dense clusters of orange-brown aecidia on both surfaces of the leaf.

It is also a host of Sphaerodothella danthoniae, a sac fungus that produces black, shiny leaf spots that occasionally coalesce into straight to irregular lines in the leaf surface of several species of Rytidosperma.
