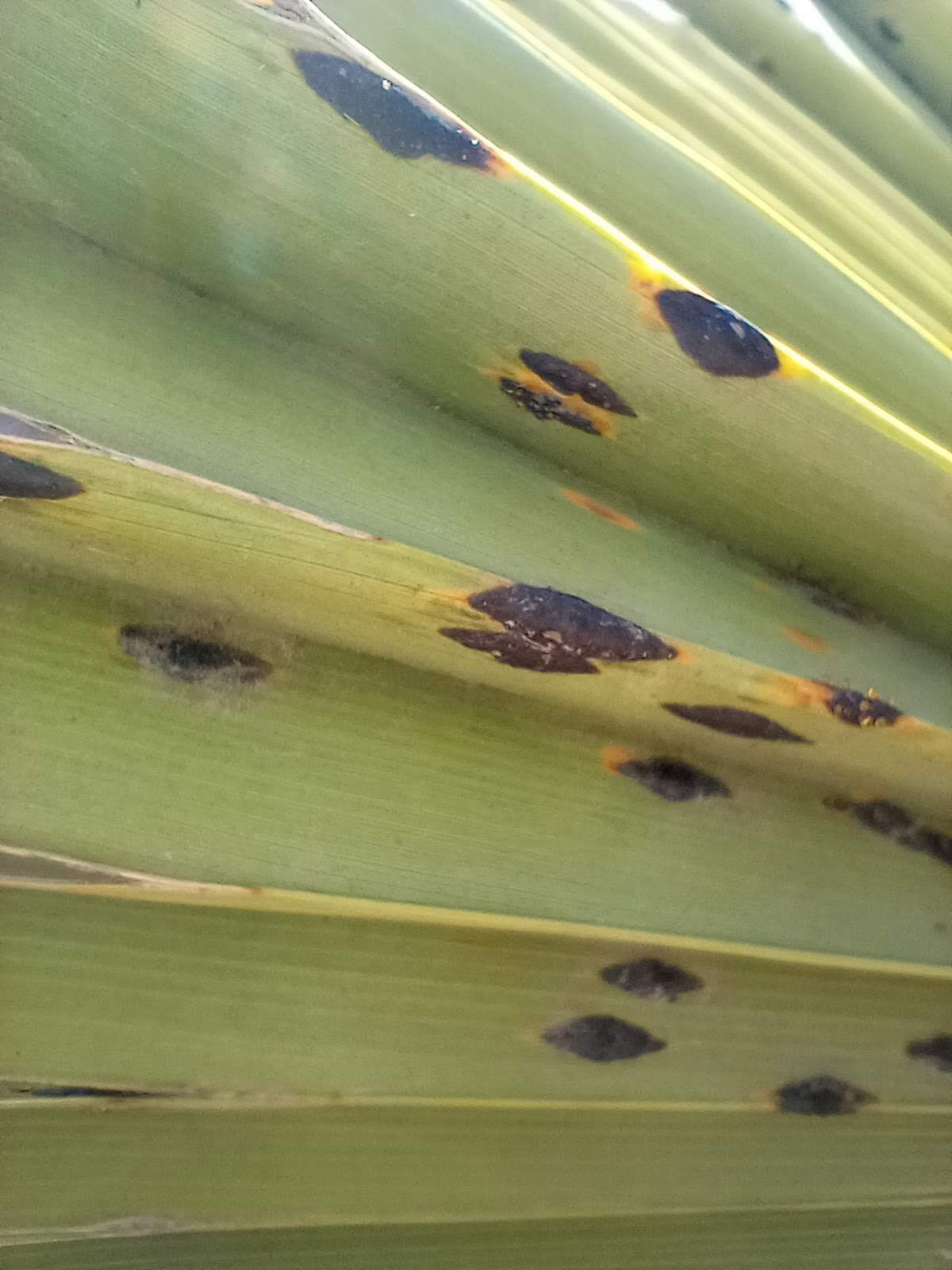
- Phaeochoropsis neowashingtoniae

Scientific classification
- Kingdom: Fungi
- Division: Ascomycota
- Class: Sordariomycetes
- Order: Phyllachorales
- Family: Phaeochoraceae
- Genus: Phaeochoropsis; K.D. Hyde & P.F. Cannon 1999

= Phaeochoropsis =

Genus of fungi

Phaeochoropsis is a genus of fungi within the family Phaeochoraceae.

== Species ==
As accepted by Species Fungorum;

- Phaeochoropsis diplothemiifolii (Bat. & F. Peres) K.D. Hyde & P.F. Cannon (1999)
- Phaeochoropsis mucosa (Speg.) K.D. Hyde & P.F. Cannon (1999)
- Phaeochoropsis neowashingtoniae (Shear) K.D. Hyde & P.F. Cannon (1999)
- Phaeochoropsis palmicola (F. Stevens) K.D. Hyde & P.F. Cannon (1999)
