= Linochora =

Scientific classification
- Kingdom: Fungi
- Division: Ascomycota
- Class: Sordariomycetes
- Order: Phyllachorales
- Family: Phyllachoraceae
- Genus: Linochora; Höhn.

Type species
- Linochora leptospermi (Cooke) Höhn. (1910)

Genus of fungi

Linochora is a genus of fungi in the family Phyllachoraceae.

A genus with many species mostly causing leaf spots on grasses.

During the early stages of the formation of tarspots on maize leaves, pycnidia (asexual fruiting body) of the anamorph (asexual reproductive stage) of Phyllachora maydis, Linochora sp., have been occasionally be observed.

== Distribution ==
It has a scattered cosmopolitan distribution, from Europe, Africa, South America and New Zealand.

== Species ==
As accepted by Species Fungorum;

- Linochora aberrans Syd. (1924)
- Linochora acaciae E. Castell. (1947)
- Linochora annonae (Speg.) Höhn. (1910)
- Linochora arechavaletae (Speg.) Höhn. (1910)
- Linochora bulbosa Parbery (1967)
- Linochora conformis (Sacc.) Petr. (1957)
- Linochora costaricensis (Speg.) Höhn. (1910)
- Linochora cynodontis (Sacc.) Petr. (1957)
- Linochora doidgeae Syd. & P. Syd. (1912)
- Linochora howardii Syd. (1932)
- Linochora laboriosa Bat. & H. Maia (1964)
- Linochora lasiuri S. Ahmad (1971)
- Linochora ligniaria Popuschoj & Marcich (1963)
- Linochora longispora Petr. (1968)
- Linochora macrospora (Speg.) Höhn. (1910)
- Linochora nigrimacula (Speg.) Höhn. (1910)
- Linochora nitens (Speg.) Höhn. (1910)
- Linochora patula Syd. (1935)
- Linochora polyadelpha Syd. (1930)
- Linochora qualeae (Allesch.) Arx (1957)
- Linochora rhododendri S. Ahmad (1971)
- Linochora rubefaciens Syd. (1929)
- Linochora sapindacearum (Speg.) Höhn. (1910)
- Linochora verbesinae Syd. (1930)

Former species;

- L. advena Syd. (1925) = Phyllachora advena, Phyllachoraceae
- L. balansae Cif. (1962) = Telimena balansae, Telimenaceae
- L. biformis (Sacc.) Petr. (1959) = Septoriella biformis, Dothideomycetes
- L. buchenaviae Petr. & Cif. (1932) = Phyllachora buchenaviae, Phyllachoraceae
- L. caricinella (Sacc. & Roum.) Höhn. (1920) = Septoria caricinella, Mycosphaerellaceae
- L. galophila Syd. (1925) = Ophiodothella galophila, Phyllachoraceae
- L. graminis (Grove) Parbery (1967) = Leptostromella graminis, Ascomycota
- L. lagerheimii Petr. (1927) = Phyllachora araliae, Phyllachoraceae
- L. leptospermi (Cooke) Höhn. (1910) = Phyllachora leptospermi, Phyllachoraceae
- L. macularum Petr. & Cif. (1932) = Phyllachora macularum, Phyllachoraceae
- L. phyllachoroidea (Speg.) Höhn. (1910) = Melophia phyllachoroidea, Ascomycota
- L. ruprechtiae (Speg.) Höhn. (1910) = Ophiodothella ruprechtiae, Phyllachoraceae
- L. samanensis Petr. & Cif. (1932) = Phyllachora samanensis, Phyllachoraceae
- L. stigmodes Syd. (1939) = Phyllachora stigmodes, Phyllachoraceae
- L. tetrica Syd. (1926) = Ophiodothella panamensis, Phyllachoraceae
- L. viticis Cif. (1962) = Phyllachora taruma, Phyllachoraceae
