= Muelleromyces =

Scientific classification
- Kingdom: Fungi
- Division: Ascomycota
- Class: Sordariomycetes
- Order: Phyllachorales
- Family: Phyllachoraceae
- Genus: Muelleromyces; Kamat & Anahosur

Type species
- Muelleromyces indicus Kamat & Anahosur

Genus of fungi

Muelleromyces is a monotypic genus of fungi in the family Phyllachoraceae. It only contains one known species; Muelleromyces indicus Kamat & Anahosur.

The genus name of Muelleromyces is in honour of Emil Müller (1920–2008), who was a Swiss mycologist.

The genus was circumscribed by Madhav Narayan Kamat and K.H. Anahosur in Experientia vol.24 on page 849 in 1968.
