= Rikatlia =

Scientific classification
- Kingdom: Fungi
- Division: Ascomycota
- Class: Sordariomycetes
- Order: Phyllachorales
- Family: Phyllachoraceae
- Genus: Rikatlia; P.F. Cannon

Type species
- Rikatlia lungusaensis (Henn.) P.F. Cannon

Genus of fungi

Rikatlia is a genus of fungi in the family Phyllachoraceae.
