= Neoflageoletia =

Scientific classification
- Kingdom: Fungi
- Division: Ascomycota
- Class: Sordariomycetes
- Order: Phyllachorales
- Family: Phyllachoraceae
- Genus: Neoflageoletia; J. Reid & C. Booth

Type species
- Neoflageoletia bambusina

Genus of fungi

Neoflageoletia is a genus of fungi in the family Phyllachoraceae. This is a monotypic genus, containing the single species Neoflageoletia bambusina.
