= Erikssonia =

Erikssonia may refer to:

- Erikssonia (butterfly), a genus of butterflies
- Erikssonia (fungus), a genus of fungi
