= Oxodeora =

Scientific classification
- Kingdom: Fungi
- Division: Ascomycota
- Class: Sordariomycetes
- Order: Phyllachorales
- Family: Phyllachoraceae
- Genus: Oxodeora; D. Hyde & P.F. Cannon

Type species
- Oxodeora petrakii (Cif.) K.D. Hyde & P.F. Cannon

Genus of fungi

Oxodeora is a genus of fungi in the family Phyllachoraceae. This is a monotypic genus, containing the single species Oxodeora petrakii.
