= Cyclodomus =

Scientific classification
- Kingdom: Fungi
- Division: Ascomycota
- Class: Sordariomycetes
- Order: Phyllachorales
- Family: Phyllachoraceae
- Genus: Cyclodomus; Höhn. 1909

Species
- Cyclodomus comosi Cyclodomus cryptomeriae Cyclodomus umbellulariae Cyclodomus yuccae

Genus of fungi

Cyclodomus is a genus of fungi within the order Phyllachorales. It is also in the family Phyllachoraceae.
