= Maculatifrondes =

Scientific classification
- Kingdom: Fungi
- Division: Ascomycota
- Class: Sordariomycetes
- Order: Phyllachorales
- Family: Phyllachoraceae
- Genus: Maculatifrondes; K.D.Hyde (1996)
- Species: M. aequatoriensis

Binomial name
- Maculatifrondes aequatoriensis K.D.Hyde (1996)

Genus of fungi

Maculatifrondes is a genus of fungi in the order Phyllachorales. This is a monotypic genus, containing the single species Maculatifrondes aequatoriensis. The fungus, first discovered in Ecuador, is associated with leaf spot of palms.
