= Erikssonia (fungus) =

Scientific classification
- Kingdom: Fungi
- Division: Ascomycota
- Class: Sordariomycetes
- Order: Phyllachorales
- Family: Phyllachoraceae
- Genus: Erikssonia; Penz. & Sacc.

Type species
- Erikssonia pulchella Penz. & Sacc.

Synonyms
- Paidania Raciborski, 1909; Rinia Penzig & P.A.Saccardo, 1901

Genus of fungi

Erikssonia is a genus of fungi in the family Phyllachoraceae.

The genus name of Erikssonia is in honour of Jakob Eriksson (1848 – 1931), who was a Swedish plant pathologist, mycologist and a taxonomist.

The genus was circumscribed by Albert Julius Otto Penzig and Pier Andrea Saccardo in Malpighia Vol.11 on page 526 in 1898.

== Distribution ==
It is only recorded as being found in Central America.

== Species ==
As accepted by Species Fungorum;

- Erikssonia carissae Doidge (1948)
- Erikssonia melastomacearum (Racib.) Arx & E. Müll. (1954)
- Erikssonia protii E.K. Cash ex J.A. Stev. (1943)
- Erikssonia pulchella Penz. & Sacc. (1898)
- Erikssonia spatholobi Syd. (1915)
