= Rytidosperma caespitosum =

Scientific classification
- Kingdom: Plantae
- Clade: Tracheophytes
- Clade: Angiosperms
- Clade: Monocots
- Clade: Commelinids
- Order: Poales
- Family: Poaceae
- Genus: Rytidosperma
- Species: R. caespitosum

Binomial name
- Rytidosperma caespitosum (Gaudich.) Connor & Edgar

Synonyms
- Austrodanthonia caespitosa (Gaudich.) H.P.Linder; Danthonia caespitosa Gaudich.

Species of plant

Rytidosperma caespitosum, known by various common names including common wallaby-grass, ringed wallaby-grass, and white-top, is a species of grass native to southern parts of Australia, and introduced to New Zealand and California.

It is one of the most widespread native grass species in Australia, but is recognised as particularly variable across its range, and potentially containing taxa within it that may be worthy of recognition.

While it has long been well-known and used by indigenous Australians, it was introduced to botany in 1829 as Danthonia caespitosa by Charles Gaudichaud-Beaupré.

== Description ==
It is a tufted perennial grass that reaches up to 90 centimetres high. The panicles are erect, with 10-30 spikelets with awns excerted from purplish glumes. Spikelets contain 4-9 individual flowers (florets). The florets have lobed apexes, and a single awn. The florets contain three rows of hairs, one on the callus, and two on the lemmas. The upper lemma hairs are dense and long, longer than the palea, but exceeded by the awn column and lateral lemma lobes. The palea is narrow-lanceolate, much exceeding the awn sinus, and the lower lemma hairs almost reach the upper.

R. caespitosum floret

=== Identification ===
As a Rytidosperma, the easiest way to identify R. clavatum is to select a single floret (which will contain a single awn, two lateral lobes, and usually three rows of hairs - one on the callus and two on the lemma). The arrangement of the hairs, as well as the relative lengths of the awn, lateral lobes, sometimes the callus can help identify to species, using a key such as that found in the New Zealand Flora.

Rytidosperma caespitosum has long been recognised as highly variable.

== Distribution ==
R. caespitosum is endemic to Australia, and introduced to New Zealand and California. Within Australia it is largely found in the south. It is considered one of the main native pasture grasses in southern Australia

=== Introduced area ===
R. caespitosum is introduced in New Zealand and the United States of America (California).

In California, it is found primarily in the vicinity of San Francisco, in the Marin, and San Mateo counties, as well as just north of San Diego, where it is apparently expanding. According to Cal-IPC, it is at high risk of becoming invasive. It is particularly abundant along the Sweeney Ridge.

In New Zealand, R. caespitosum naturalised around 1892, with the first collection being from Taieri Ferry in Otago, by Donald Petrie. It is found primarily in the vicinity of Auckland and Christchurch, and occasionally elsewhere.

== Habitat and Ecology ==
R. caespitosum grows in diverse habitats. It is generally restricted to sunny habitats, including grassland, desert, and heathland. It tolerates a range of salinity and soils, including sands, loams, limestone, granite and laterite. It is found in a variety of indigenous habitats, but is also known to occur alongside numerous ruderal species.

=== Species Associations ===
==== Seed predation ====
R. caespitosum seeds are eaten by a number of bird species, including red-browed finches, pigeons, superb parrots, and quails. Harvester ants in the genera Melophorus, Chelaner, and Pheidole collect R. caespitosum seeds for food, as well as those from other Australian grasses.

==== Microbiota ====
The rust fungus Uromyces danthoniae, a species found that grows parasitically on the leaves of several Rytidosperma species in New Zealand and Australia, infects Rytidosperma caespitosum. It forms dense clusters of orange-brown aecidia on both surfaces of the leaf.

It is also a host of Sphaerodothella danthoniae, a sac fungus that produces black, shiny leaf spots that occasionally coalesce into straight to irregular lines in the leaf surface of several species of Rytidosperma.

R. caespitosum is a known host of the bacterion Clavibacter toxicus, which renders a number of pasture grass species toxic to livestock.

=== Life cycle and seed dispersal ===
In Australia, flowering occurs in spring or summer, usually in response to rain. In this species, flowering phenology is controlled differently in different habitats. In cool and moist temperate habitats, floral initiation is controlled by day length and temperature to coincide with a predictable growing season. In hot semiarid habitats there is more limited control over floral initiation, allowing for reproduction to occur whenever soil moisture and temperature permit plant growth. Flowers are wind pollinated.

It produces seeds shortly after flowering, which are dispersed to a limited degree by wind, and in longer distances by humans, machinery (particularly mowing machinery), and animals. In California, it often spreads along roadsides. It is capable of building up flammable thatch and grows well to newly burnt areas.

== Uses ==
Indigenous Wathaurung Australians use wallaby grasses like R. caespitosum to make flour, by grinding down the seeds, for dampers and johnny cakes.

R. caespitosum is sometimes planted in mid-rows within vineyards.

== Taxonomy ==
The species was first described in 1829 as Danthonia caespitosa by Charles Gaudichaud-Beaupré, from a specimen found at Shark Bay in Western Australia. In 1963 it was moved to the new genus Notodanthonia by Russian-New Zealand botanist Victor Zotov, who recognised that Southern Hemisphere species that had been placed in Danthonia were distinct from those in the Northern Hemisphere.

The genus Notodanthonia was synonymised with Rytidosperma in Nicora (1973), after it was recognised that they referred to the same group. The genus Notodanthonia was only described in 1963 by Zotov, whereas Rytidosperma was described in 1854 by Steudel. As such, the older name Rytidosperma took priority under the International Code of Nomenclature. In 1979, New Zealand botanists Henry Connor and Elizabeth Edgar moved the whole Notodanthonia genus to Rytidosperma, following Nicora (1973), and named the species Rytidosperma caespitosum.

In 1993 it was transferred into Austrodanthonia by Hans Peter Linder. However, in 2010 Austrodanthonia was again submerged into a broader Rytidosperma, and all Austrodanthonia species are now considered part of the genus Rytidosperma.

=== Intraspecific taxonomy ===
R. caespitosum exhibits a wide range of forms. While working on her attempt at revising Rytidosperma in Australia, Dr. Joyce Winifred Vickery struggled to segregate infraspecific taxa from it. Although certain groups of specimens showed combinations of characters that might justify recognition, other specimens often showed intermediate characters.

Within the species, there have long been three chromosomal races, with most specimens having been 2n=48, while one population was 2n=72, and plants from dry parts of South Australia having been 2n=24. Recently, this last chromosomal race was split off into a new species, Rytidosperma robertsoniae, recognising that it is reproductively isolated and is identifiable from characters that differentiate it from R. caespitosum.

=== Etymology ===
Rytidosperma: 'wrinkled seed' from the Greek 'rhytidos' = wrinkled and 'sperma' = seed.

caespitosum: Latin caespes (grass that has been cut) and -osa (abundance), meaning growing in tufts or patches.
