= Rehmiodothis =

Scientific classification
- Kingdom: Fungi
- Division: Ascomycota
- Class: Sordariomycetes
- Order: Phyllachorales
- Family: Phyllachoraceae
- Genus: Rehmiodothis; Theiss. & Syd.

Type species
- Rehmiodothis osbeckiae (Berk. & Broome) Theiss. & Syd.

Genus of fungi

Rehmiodothis is a genus of fungi in the family Phyllachoraceae.
