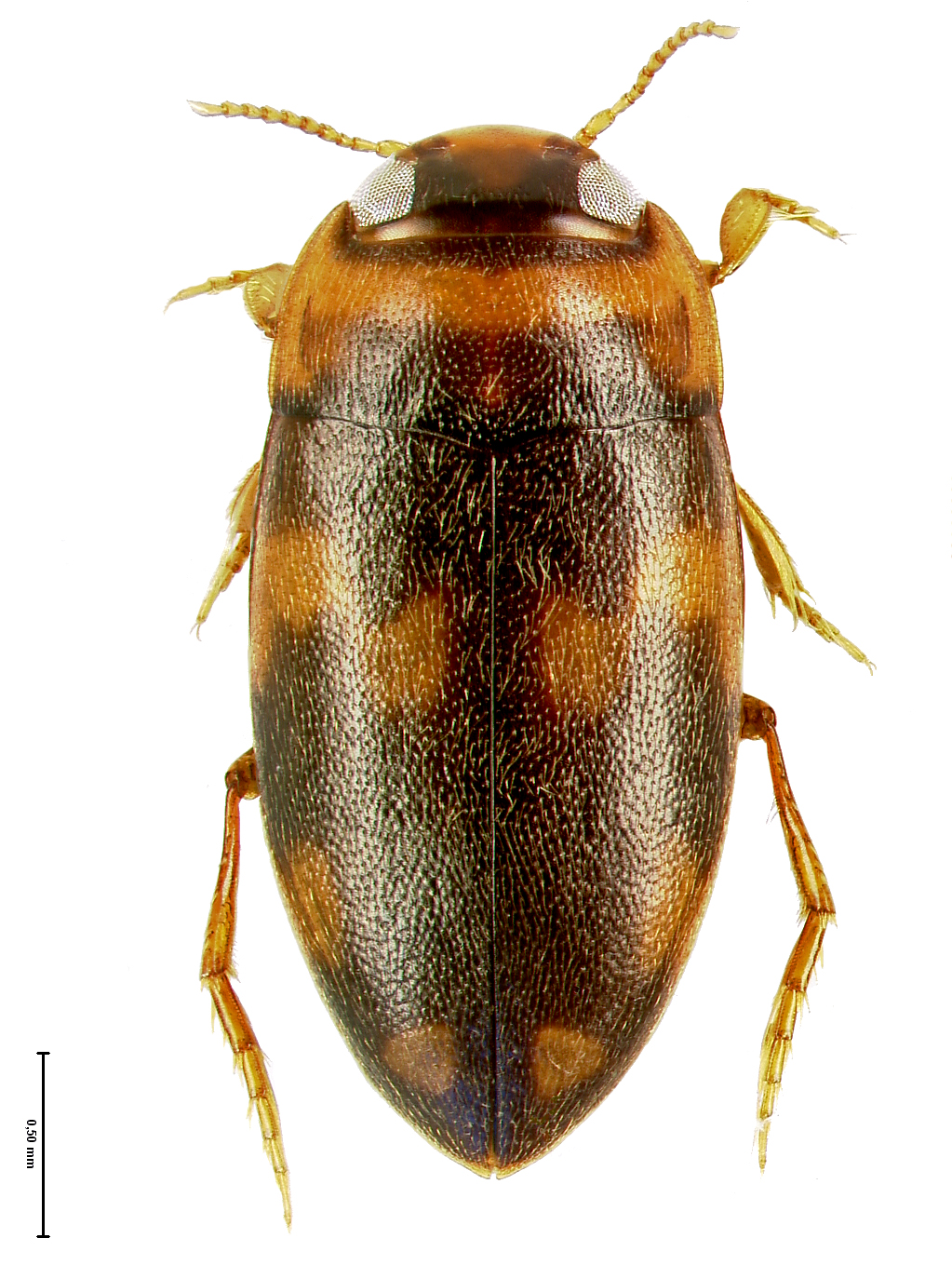
- Neobidessodes basalis

Scientific classification
- Kingdom: Animalia
- Phylum: Arthropoda
- Class: Insecta
- Order: Coleoptera
- Suborder: Adephaga
- Family: Dytiscidae
- Subfamily: Hydroporinae
- Tribe: Bidessini
- Genus: Neobidessodes; Hendrich & Balke, 2009

= Neobidessodes =

Genus of beetles

Neobidessodes is a genus of predaceous diving beetles in the family Dytiscidae. There are about 10 described species in Neobidessodes. They are found in Australasia. The genus was first described in 2009, and the type species is N. denticulatus.

== Species ==
These 10 species belong to the genus Neobidessodes:

- Neobidessodes bilita (Watts, 1978)
- Neobidessodes darwiniensis Hendrich & Balke, 2011
- Neobidessodes denticulatus (Sharp, 1882)
- Neobidessodes flavosignatus (Zimmermann, 1922)
- Neobidessodes grossus (Zimmermann, 1922)
- Neobidessodes gutteridgei (Watts & Humphreys, 2003)
- Neobidessodes limestoneensis (Watts & Humphreys, 2003)
- Neobidessodes mjobergi (Zimmermann, 1922)
- Neobidessodes samkrisi Hendrich & Balke, 2009
- Neobidessodes thoracicus Hendrich & Balke, 2009
