= Lindauella =

Scientific classification
- Kingdom: Fungi
- Division: Ascomycota
- Class: Sordariomycetes
- Order: Phyllachorales
- Genus: Lindauella; Rehm 1900
- Species: L. pyrenocarpoidea

Binomial name
- Lindauella pyrenocarpoidea Rehm 1900

Genus of fungi

Lindauella is a genus of fungi in the order Phyllachorales. This is a monotypic genus, containing the single species Lindauella pyrenocarpoidea.

The genus name of Lindauella is in honour of Gustav Lindau (1866-1923), who was a German mycologist and botanist.

The genus was circumscribed by Heinrich Simon Ludwig Friedrich Felix Rehm in Hedwigia vol.39 on page 82 in 1900.
