= Camarotella acrocomiae =

Scientific classification
- Kingdom: Fungi
- Division: Ascomycota
- Class: Sordariomycetes
- Order: Phyllachorales
- Family: Phyllachoraceae
- Genus: Camarotella
- Species: C. acrocomiae

Binomial name
- Camarotella acrocomiae (Mont.) K.D. Hyde & P.F. Cannon, (1999)

Synonyms
- Auerswaldia rimosa Speg., (1888); Bagnisiopsis astrocaryae (Rehm) Petr., (1940); Bagnisiopsis roystoneae (J.R. Johnst. & Bruner) Cif., (1961); Camarotella astrocaryae (Rehm) Theiss. & Syd., (1915); Catacauma torrendiella Bat., (1948); Dothidea acrocomiae Mont., (1856); Hysterodothis rimosa (Speg.) Höhn., Sber. Akad. Wiss. Wien, (1909); Montagnella astrocaryae Rehm, (1897); Phaeochora acrocomiae (Mont.) Theiss. & Syd., (1915); Phyllachora acrocomiae (Mont.) Sacc., (1883); Phyllachora cocoicola Henn., (1895); Phyllachora roystoneae J.R. Johnst. & Bruner, (1918); Phyllachora torrendiella (Bat.) Subileau, Renard & Dennet., (1993); Sphaerodothis acrocomiae (Mont.) Arx & E. Müll., (1954); Sphaerodothis rimosa (Speg.) Shear, (1909); Sphaerodothis torrendiella (Bat.) J.L. Bezerra, (1991)

Species of fungus

Camarotella acrocomiae is a plant pathogen.
