= Petrakina =

Scientific classification
- Kingdom: Fungi
- Division: Ascomycota
- Class: Dothideomycetes
- Order: Asterinales
- Family: Asterinaceae
- Genus: Petrakina; Cif.

Type species
- Petrakina mirabilis Cif.

Genus of fungi

Petrakina is a genus of fungi in the Asterinaceae family. The relationship of this taxon to other taxa within the class is unknown (incertae sedis), and it has not yet been placed with certainty into any order.

The genus name of Petrakina is in honour of Franz Petrak (1886–1973), who was an Austrian-Czech mycologist.

The genus was circumscribed by Raffaele Ciferri in Ann. Mycol. vol.30 on page 149 and 225 in 1932.
