= Mangrovispora =

Scientific classification
- Kingdom: Fungi
- Division: Ascomycota
- Class: Sordariomycetes
- Order: Phyllachorales
- Family: incertae sedis
- Genus: Mangrovispora; K.D. Hyde & Nagakiri

Species
- Mangrovispora irregularis Mangrovispora pemphii

Genus of fungi

Mangrovispora is a genus of fungi within the order Phyllachorales. The relationship of this taxon to other taxa within the class is unknown (incertae sedis).
