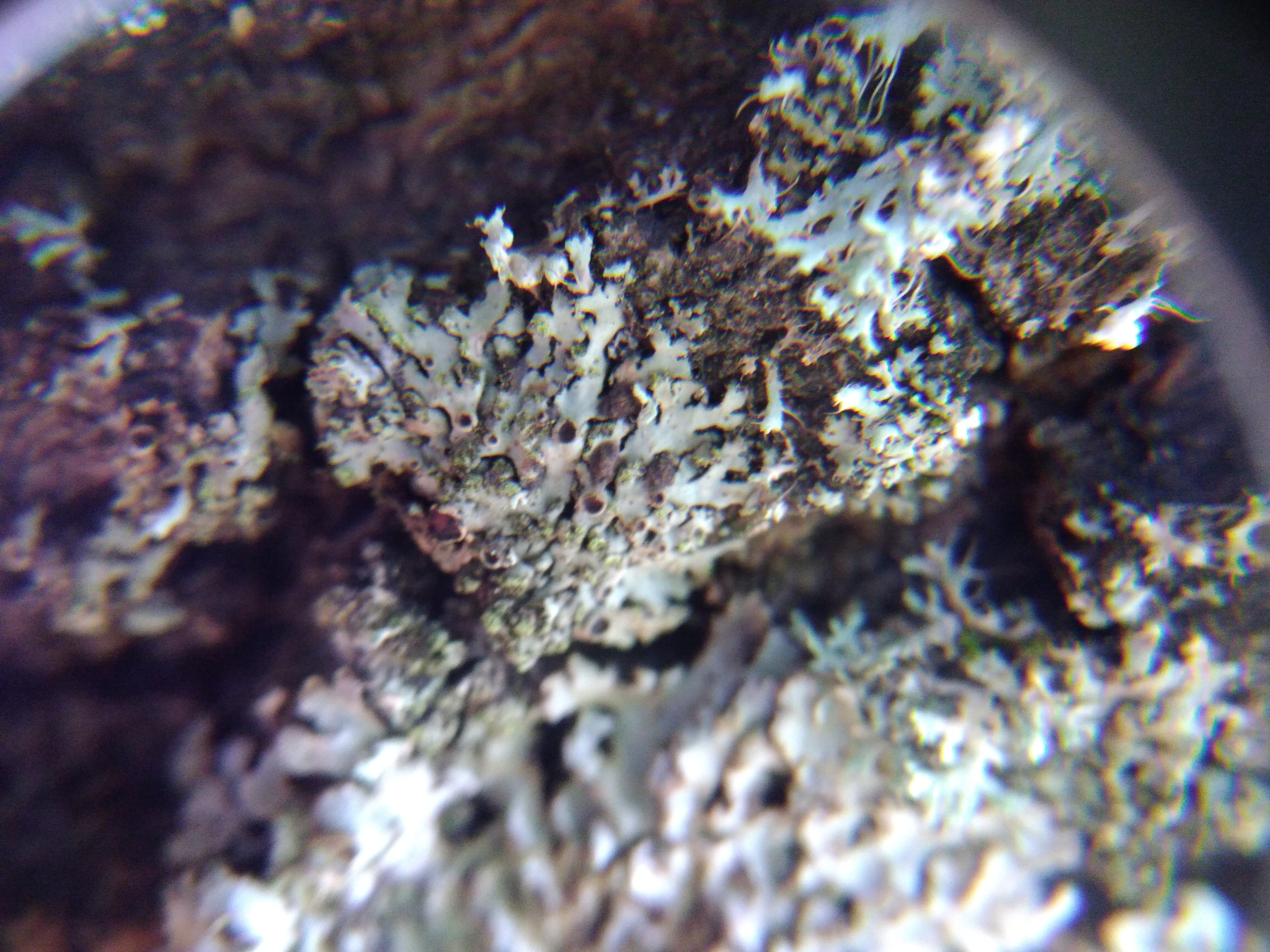
- Lichenochora obscuroides

Scientific classification
- Kingdom: Fungi
- Division: Ascomycota
- Class: Sordariomycetes
- Order: Phyllachorales
- Family: Phyllachoraceae
- Genus: Lichenochora; Hafellner (1989)

Type species
- Lichenochora thallina (Cooke) Hafellner (1989)

Synonyms
- Laestadia [unranked] Paralaestadia Sacc. & D.Sacc. (1905); Paralaestadia (Sacc. & D.Sacc.) Vain. (1921)

= Lichenochora =

Genus of fungi

Lichenochora is a genus of fungi in the family Phyllachoraceae. It has 44 species. All species in the genus are lichenicolous, meaning they grow parasitically on lichens. The genus was circumscribed by Josef Hafellner in 1989, with Lichenochora thallina assigned as the type species.

== Description ==
Lichenochora fungi form tiny, flask-shaped reproductive structures called perithecia that are typically 0.15-0.3 mm in diameter. The perithecia are embedded within small swellings or galls that they cause to form in their host lichen's body (thallus). Only the dark-coloured openings of these structures are visible on the surface.

The walls of the perithecia are brown in colour and made up of several layers of flattened cells. Inside each perithecium are microscopic sac-like structures called asci, which contain the fungal spores. A distinctive feature of Lichenochora is that each ascus contains either four or eight spores, depending on the species. The spores themselves are colourless (hyaline) and divided into two cells.

Another characteristic feature is the presence of numerous oil droplets (lipid droplets) within various parts of the fungal structure, including the spores and the tissue surrounding them. The genus also has specialised filaments called periphyses around the opening of the perithecia, which often have swollen outer walls and may be slightly brown at the tips.

All known species of Lichenochora are highly specific about which lichens they parasitise, with most species only growing on particular genera or species of lichens. They show a particular preference for lichens in the family Physciaceae. While these fungi are technically parasites, they typically do not severely damage their host lichens, though they may cause some localised tissue death and discolouration where they grow. The species in the can be distinguished from each other by characteristics such as spore size and shape, the number of spores per ascus, and which lichen species they parasitise.

== Genera ==
As of February 2025, Species Fungorum (in the Catalogue of Life) accept 47 species of Lichenochora:

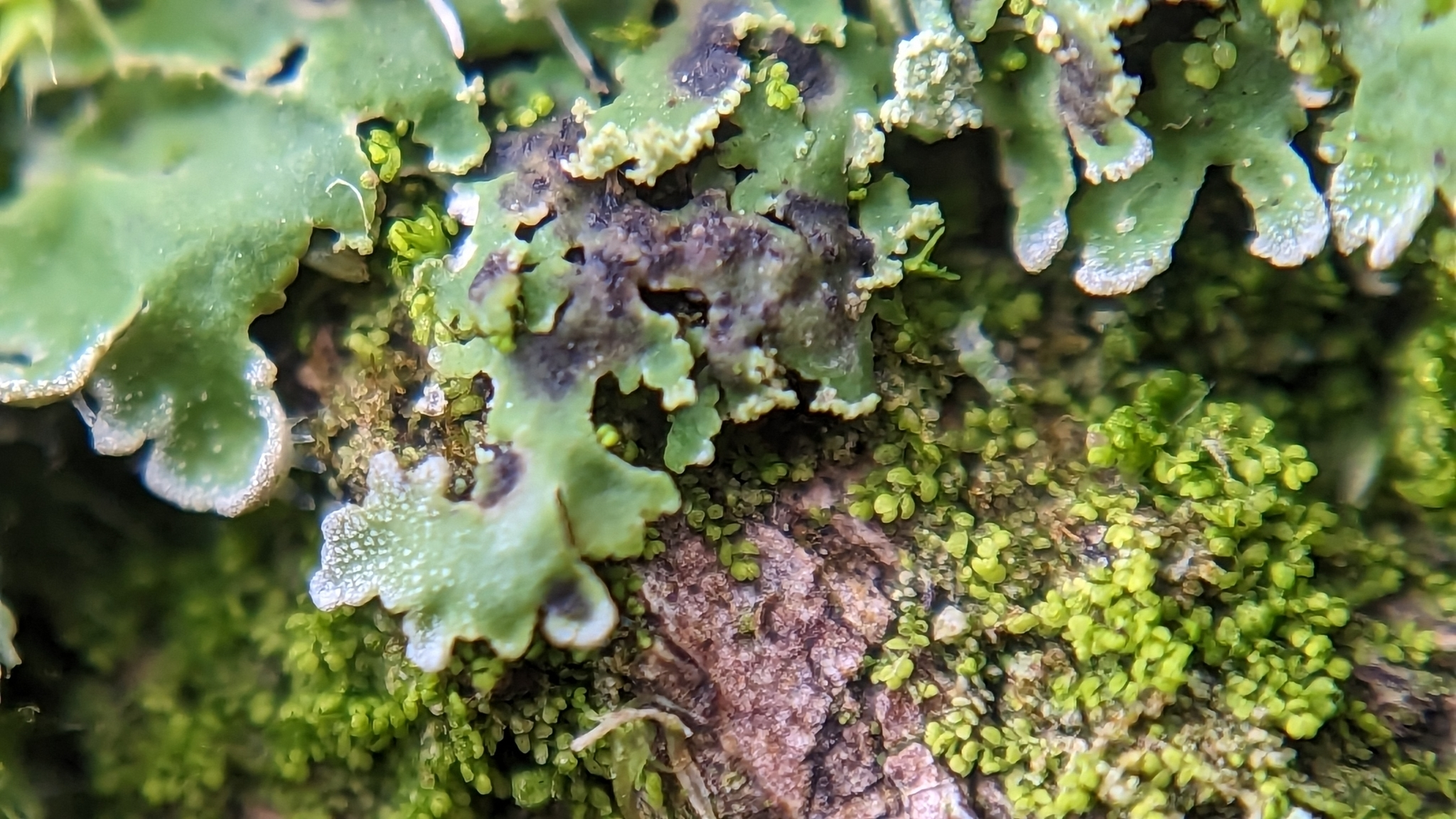
Lichenochora weillii

- Lichenochora acutispora Etayo (2008)
- Lichenochora aipoliae Etayo, Nav.-Ros. & Coppins (2008)
- Lichenochora ajaysinghii Y.Joshi (2020)
- Lichenochora aprica Hafellner & Nik. Hoffm. (2000)
- Lichenochora arctica Zhurb. (2013)
- Lichenochora atrans Halıcı, K.Knudsen & Candan (2009)
- Lichenochora bacidiispora Etayo (2017)
- Lichenochora bellemerei Nav.-Ros., Cl.Roux & Diederich (1998)
- Lichenochora caloplacae Zhurb. (2013)
- Lichenochora chimaerica Etayo (2017)
- Lichenochora clauzadei Nav.-Ros., Cl.Roux & Llimona (1994)
- Lichenochora coarctatae (B.de Lesd.) Hafellner & F. Berger (2000)
- Lichenochora collematum Nik. Hoffm. & Hafellner (2000)
- Lichenochora constrictella (Müll.Arg.) Hafellner (1989)
- Lichenochora coppinsii Etayo & Nav.-Ros. (2008)
- Lichenochora elegans Hafellner, G.Herzog & H.Mayrhofer (2008)
- Lichenochora epidesertorum Nav.-Ros. (1998)
- Lichenochora epifulgens Nav.-Ros. & Cl. Roux (1998)
- Lichenochora epimarmorata Nav.-Ros. (1998)
- Lichenochora epinashii Nav.-Ros. & Etayo (2001)
- Lichenochora gahavisukae Diederich (1997)
- Lichenochora galligena R.Sant. & Hafellner (1989)
- Lichenochora haematommatum R.C.Harris & Lendemer (2016)
- Lichenochora heppiae Cl.Roux (1994)
- Lichenochora hypanica S.Y.Kondr., Lőkös & Hur (2014)
- Lichenochora hyperphysciae Etayo (2011)
- Lichenochora inconspicua Hafellner (1989)
- Lichenochora lecidellae Boqueras & Nav.-Ros. (1998)
- Lichenochora lepidiotae (Anzi) Etayo & Nav.-Ros. (2008)
- Lichenochora makareviczae S.Y.Kondr., Lőkös & Hur (2015)
- Lichenochora mediterraneae Calat., Nav.-Ros. & E.Calvo (2000)
- Lichenochora monegrina Etayo (2010)
- Lichenochora obscuroides (Linds.) Triebel & Rambold (1992)
- Lichenochora paucispora Etayo & Nav.-Ros. (2008)
- Lichenochora physciicola (Ihlen & R.Sant.) Hafellner (2012)
- Lichenochora polycoccoides Hafellner & R.Sant. (1989)
- Lichenochora pyrenodesmiae Nav.-Ros. & Cl.Roux (1998)
- Lichenochora rinodinae Zhurb. (2013)
- Lichenochora sedelnikoviorum Zhurb. (2021)
- Lichenochora sinapispermae Etayo & Nav.-Ros. (2001)
- Lichenochora tertia Etayo, Flakus & Rodr. Flakus (2013)
- Lichenochora thallina (Cooke) Hafellner (1989)
- Lichenochora thorii Zhurb. (2008)
- Lichenochora verrucicola (Wedd.) Nik.Hoffm. & Hafellner (2000)
- Lichenochora wasseri S.Y.Kondr. (1996)
- Lichenochora weillii (Werner) Hafellner & R.Sant. (1989)
- Lichenochora xanthoriae Triebel & Rambold (1991)
