= Trabutia =

Scientific classification
- Kingdom: Fungi
- Division: Ascomycota
- Class: Sordariomycetes
- Order: Phyllachorales
- Family: Phyllachoraceae
- Genus: Trabutia; Sacc. & Roum.

Type species
- Trabutia quercina (F. Rudolphi ex Fr.) Sacc. & Roum.

Genus of fungi

Trabutia is a genus of fungi in the family Phyllachoraceae.

The genus was circumscribed by Pier Andrea Saccardo and Casimir Roumeguère in Rev. Mycol. (Toulouse) vol.3 on pages 26-27 in 1881.

The genus name of Trabutia is in honour of Louis Charles Trabut (1853–1929), who was a French botanist and physician. He is remembered for his work involving the flora of Algeria and Tunisia.

== Species ==
As accepted by Species Fungorum;

- Trabutia amboinensis Syd. (1922)
- Trabutia amphigena Chardón (1934)
- Trabutia austinii (Cooke) Theiss. & Syd. (1914)
- Trabutia basanacanthea Chardón (1932)
- Trabutia basanacantheana Bat. (1959)
- Trabutia benguetensis H.S. Yates (1917)
- Trabutia bucidae Chardón (1921)
- Trabutia calarcana Chardón (1930)
- Trabutia conocephali Racib. (1915)
- Trabutia conzattiana Sacc. (1912)
- Trabutia crotonicola Rehm (1890)
- Trabutia crustosa Rick (1933)
- Trabutia distinguenda Rehm ex Theiss. & Syd. (1915)
- Trabutia erythrinae Rick (1905)
- Trabutia erythrospora (Berk. & M.A. Curtis) Cooke (1885)
- Trabutia escalloniae Theiss. & Syd. (1915)
- Trabutia granulata (Berk. & Broome) Petch (1919)
- Trabutia irosinensis Syd. (1925)
- Trabutia lonicerae Racib. (1915)
- Trabutia mangiferae Chardón (1929)
- Trabutia mauritiae (Mart.) Sacc. & D. Sacc. (1905)
- Trabutia minima F. Stevens & Weedon (1925)
- Trabutia neurophila Syd. (1925)
- Trabutia nothofagi Syd. (1924)
- Trabutia pacifica Syd. (1925)
- Trabutia pampulhae Viégas (1944)
- Trabutia pithecellobii Cooke & Massee (1896)
- Trabutia quercina (F. Rudolphi ex Fr.) Sacc. & Roum. (1881)
- Trabutia quercus (F. Stevens) Petr. (1929)
- Trabutia roupalae Viégas (1944)
- Trabutia sinensis Arx & E. Müll. (1954)
- Trabutia tosta (Berk. & M.A. Curtis) Cooke (1885)
- Trabutia xylosmae F. Stevens (1927)

Former species; (most are family Phyllachoraceae)

- T. abyssinica (Henn.) Theiss. & Syd. (1915) = Phyllachora abyssinica
- T. ambigua Syd. & P. Syd. (1911) = Phyllachora ambigua
- T. arrabidaeae (Henn.) Theiss. & Syd. (1915) = Munkiella caa-guazu
- T. atroinquinans (G. Winter) Theiss. & Syd. (1915) = Phyllachora atroinquinans
- T. bauhiniae G. Winter (1885) = Phyllachora bauhiniae
- T. brasiliensis (Speg.) Chardón (1932) = Phyllachora brasiliensis
- T. butleri Theiss. & Syd. (1915) = Phyllachora butleri
- T. cayennensis (DC.) Sacc. (1882) = Phyllachora cayennensis
- T. chinensis H.S. Yates (1917) = Phyllachora yatesii
- T. cocoicola Sivan. (1979) = Botryosphaeria cocoicola, Botryosphaeriaceae
- T. conica Chardón (1921) = Phyllachora conica
- T. conspicua Chardón (1927) = Phyllachora capparis
- T. constellata (Berk. & Broome) Cooke (1885) = Hysterostomella spurcaria, Parmulariaceae
- T. danthoniae Chardón (1946) = Phyllachora danthoniae
- T. dothideoides (Speg.) Höhn. (1909) = Phyllachora dothideoides
- T. elmeri Theiss. & Syd. (1915) = Phyllachora banahaensis
- T. eucalypti Cooke & Massee (1888) = Phyllachora eucalypti
- T. evansii Theiss. & Syd. (1915) = Phyllachora howardiana
- T. fici-dekdekenae Bacc. (1917) = Phyllachora fici-dekdekenae
- T. fici-hochstetteri Bacc. (1917) = Phyllachora fici-hochstetteri
- T. ficuum (Niessl) Theiss. & Syd. (1915) = Phyllachora ficuum
- T. guarapiensis Rehm (1901) = Phyllachora paraguaya
- T. guazumae Chardón (1921) = Phyllachora guazumae
- T. incrustans (Racib.) Racib. ex Theiss. & Syd. (1915) = Phyllachora incrustans
- T. inimica Theiss. & Syd. (1915) = Phyllachora inimica
- T. lagerheimiana (Rehm) Theiss. & Syd. (1915) = Phyllachora lagerheimiana
- T. lantanae Henn. (1895) = Anhellia lantanae, Myriangiaceae
- T. merrillii (Ricker) Theiss. & Syd. (1917) = Phyllachora merrillii
- T. nervisequens (Lingelsh.) Theiss. & Syd. (1915) = Phyllachora nervisequens
- T. nervisequens var. robusta Doidge (1921) = Phyllachora nervisequens
- T. novoguineensis Theiss. & Syd. (1915) = Phyllachora novoguineensis
- T. osbeckiae T.S. Ramakr. & Sundaram (1954) = Rehmiodothis osbeckiae
- T. parvicapsa Cooke (1891) = Phyllachora parvicapsa
- T. phyllodii Cooke & Massee (1891) = Polystigma phyllodii
- T. pittospori (Henn.) Theiss. & Syd. (1915) = Phyllachora pittospori
- T. portoricensis F. Stevens (1920) = Phyllachora portoricensis
- T. quercina var. terraciani (De Not. & Bagl.) Sacc. (1882) = Trabutia quercina
- T. randiae (Rehm) Theiss. & Syd. (1915) = Phyllachora randiae
- T. randiae subsp. aculeatae (Ferd. & Winge) Theiss. & Syd. (1915) = Phyllachora randiae
- T. stephaniae Racib. (1900) = Phyllachora stephaniae
- T. sycomori Bacc. (1916) = Phyllachora sycomori
- T. tonkinensis (Sacc. & P. Syd.) Theiss. & Syd. (1915) = Phyllachora tonkinensis
- T. vernicosa Theiss. & Syd. (1915) = Phyllachora fici-heterophyllae
- T. zanthoxyli Chardón (1926) = Phyllachora winteri
