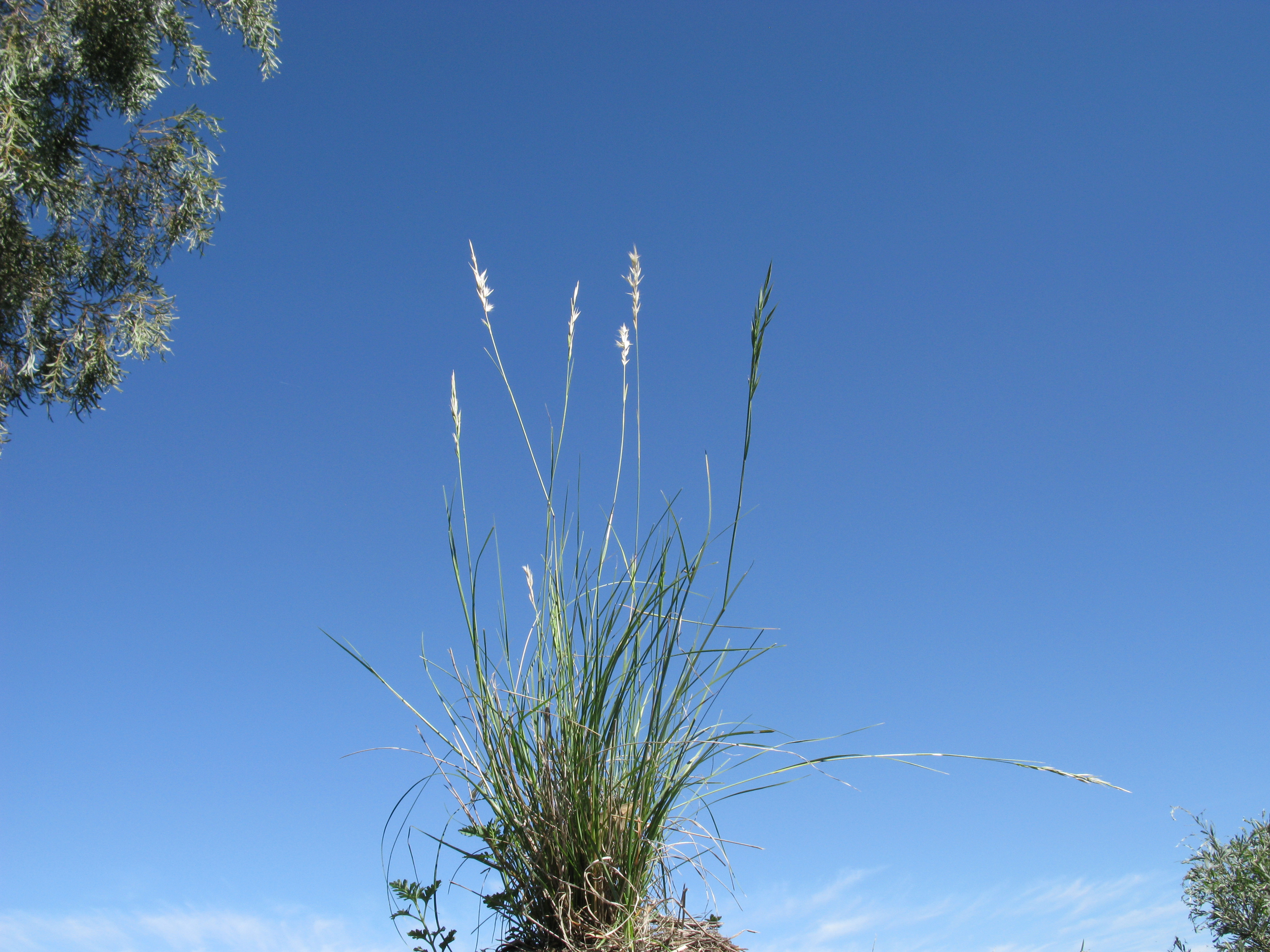

Scientific classification
- Kingdom: Plantae
- Clade: Tracheophytes
- Clade: Angiosperms
- Clade: Monocots
- Clade: Commelinids
- Order: Poales
- Family: Poaceae
- Genus: Rytidosperma
- Species: R. bipartitum

Binomial name
- Rytidosperma bipartitum (Link) A.M. Humphreys & H.P.Linder

Synonyms
- Rytidosperma bipartitum (Link) H.P.Linder; Rytidosperma linkii (Kunth) Connor & Edgar; Rytidosperma linkii var. linkii (Kunth) Connor & Edgar; Austrodanthonia bipartita (Link) H.P.Linder; Danthonia linkii var. linkii Kunth

= Rytidosperma bipartitum =

Species of grass

Rytidosperma bipartitum, the leafy wallaby grass, is a perennial species of grass found in south eastern Australia. Usually found on the heavier clay or on loamy soils in open eucalyptus woodland. The habit is somewhat variable, erect and densely tufted. The grass may grow up to 0.7 m (2 ft 4 in) tall.

== Description ==
Rytidosperma bipartitum is an erect, tufted perennial up to 0.7 m (2 1/4 ft) high. Stem bearing the inflorescence, or culm, is smooth, slender and generally 4-noded. The lower part of the leaf containing the sheath usually smooth, with small membranous appendage on the top of the sheath (ligule) having short hairs. Leaf blade is 20 to 30 cm (7 7/8 to 11 3/4 in) long and 1 to 2.5 mm (1/16 to 1/8 in) wide, flat to loosely or closely rolled inwards, usually slightly hairy, bearing coarse and rough hairs.

Inflorescence with a few to numerous spikelets, lanceolate or ovate in shape, 4 to 12 cm (1 5/8 to 4 3/4 in) long. Inflorescence can be spreading or contracted. Spikelets are 4 to 6-flowered, pale-greenish to straw in colour. Spikelet florets, which are each flower together with lemma and palea that enclose it, are shorter than the glumes (bracts at the base of the grass spikelet) except for the awns (fine bristle-like appendage). Glumes with membranous margins, 7 to 13 mm (1/4 to 1/2 in) long. Lemmas 3 to 4 mm (1/8 to 3/16 in) long, triangular to lanceolate, hairy on the back; lateral lobes with longitudinal lines or ridges (striate) in the lower part, tapering very gradually into 2 to 3 mm (1/16 to 1/8 in) long awns; central awn exceeds lateral lobes up to 5 mm (1/4 in).

Rytidosperma bipartitum is closely related to Rytidosperma fulvum, but has a slightly smaller stature, a pale central awn, and found usually in grassland rather than forest habitat.

== Ecology ==
R. bipartitum is a host of Sphaerodothella danthoniae, a sac fungus that produces black, shiny leaf spots that occasionally coalesce into straight to irregular lines in the leaf surface of several species of Rytidosperma.
