= Uropolystigma =

Scientific classification
- Kingdom: Fungi
- Division: Ascomycota
- Class: Sordariomycetes
- Order: Phyllachorales
- Family: Phyllachoraceae
- Genus: Uropolystigma; Maubl.

Type species
- Uropolystigma atrotestaceum Maubl.

Genus of fungi

Uropolystigma is a genus of fungi in the family Phyllachoraceae. This is a monotypic genus, containing the single species Uropolystigma atrotestaceum.
