= Muellerites =

Scientific classification
- Kingdom: Fungi
- Division: Ascomycota
- Class: Dothideomycetes
- Subclass: incertae sedis
- Genus: Muellerites; L. Holm

Type species
- Muellerites juniperi (E. Müll. & Arx) L. Holm

Genus of fungi

Muellerites is a genus of fungi in the class Dothideomycetes. The relationship of this taxon to other taxa within the class is unknown (incertae sedis). A monotypic genus, it contains the single species Muellerites juniperi.

The genus name of Muellerites is in honour of Emil Müller (1920–2008), who was a Swiss mycologist.

The genus was circumscribed by Lennart Holm in Svensk Bot. Tidskr. vol.62 on page 231 in 1968.

== See also ==
- List of Dothideomycetes genera incertae sedis
