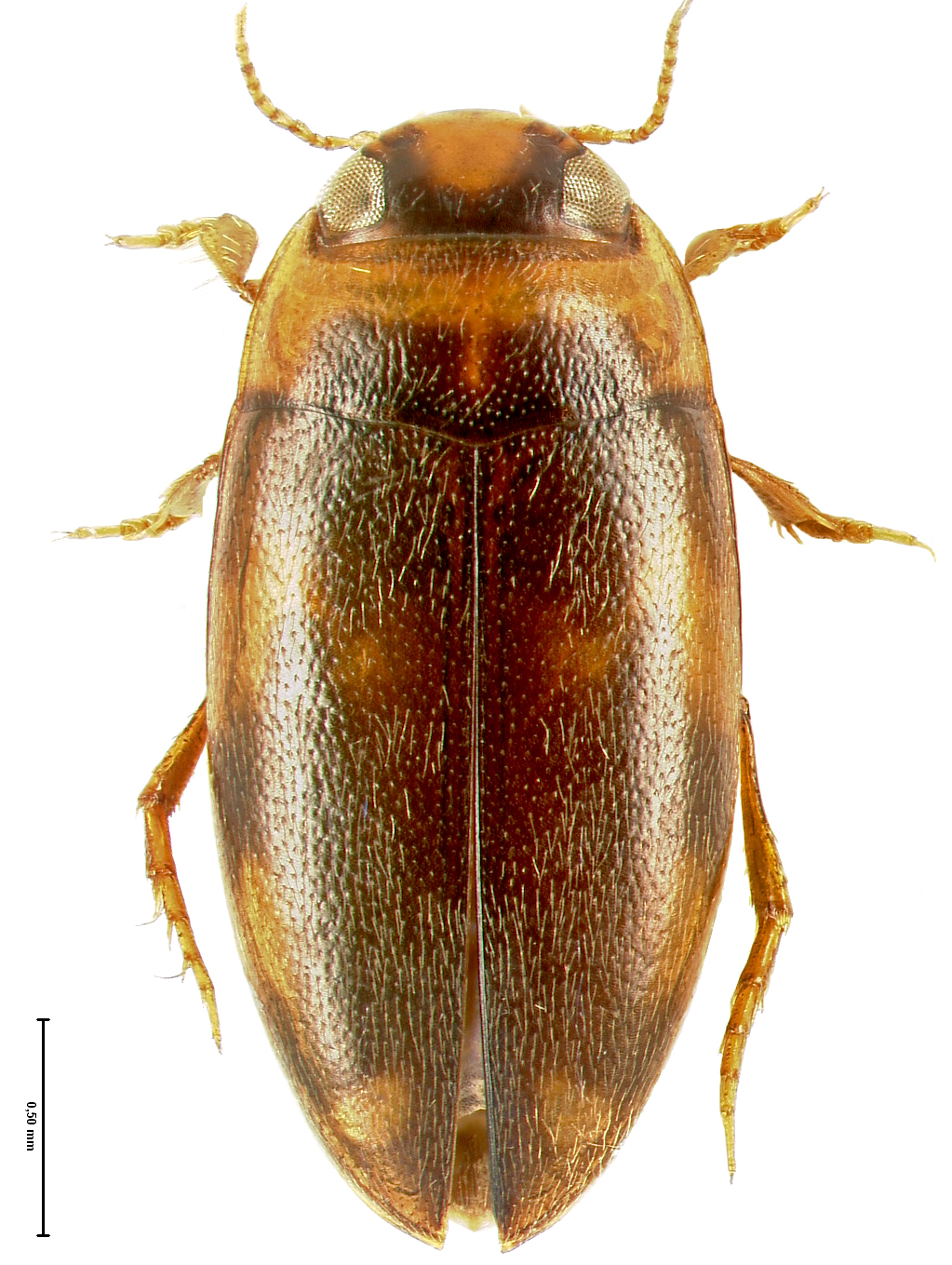

Scientific classification
- Domain: Eukaryota
- Kingdom: Animalia
- Phylum: Arthropoda
- Class: Insecta
- Order: Coleoptera
- Suborder: Adephaga
- Family: Dytiscidae
- Genus: Neobidessodes
- Species: N. mjobergi

Binomial name
- Neobidessodes mjobergi (Zimmermann, 1922)

Synonyms
- Bidessus mjobergi Zimmermann, 1922

= Neobidessodes mjobergi =

Species of beetle

Paralectotype site'"`UNIQ--ref-00000007-QINU`"'

Neobidessodes mjobergi is a carnivorous subterranean water beetle, in the Bidessini tribe of the Dytiscidae family. It was first described in 1922 by Alois Zimmermann as Bidessus mjobergi, and reassigned to the genus of Neobidessodes in 2009 by Hendrich and others.

It is found in Western Australia, the Northern Territory and Queensland.

The species name honours Eric Mjöberg.
