= Neobidessodes bilita =

Scientific classification
- Domain: Eukaryota
- Kingdom: Animalia
- Phylum: Arthropoda
- Class: Insecta
- Order: Coleoptera
- Suborder: Adephaga
- Family: Dytiscidae
- Genus: Neobidessodes
- Species: N. bilita

Binomial name
- Neobidessodes bilita (Watts, 1978)

Synonyms
- Bidessodes bilita Watts, 1978

Species of beetle

Neobidessodes bilita is a carnivorous subterranean water beetle, in the Bidessini tribe of the Dytiscidae family. It was first described in 1978 by Chris H.S. Watts as Bidessodes bilita, and reassigned to the genus of Neobidessodes in 2009 by Hendrich and others.

It is found in Victoria, the New South Wales and Queensland.
