= Camarotella costaricensis =

Scientific classification
- Kingdom: Fungi
- Division: Ascomycota
- Class: Sordariomycetes
- Order: Phyllachorales
- Family: Phyllachoraceae
- Genus: Camarotella
- Species: C. costaricensis

Binomial name
- Camarotella costaricensis (F. Stevens) K.D. Hyde & P.F. Cannon, (1999)

Synonyms
- Dothidina costaricensis F. Stevens, (1927); Sphaerodothis acrocomiae Chardón & Baker{?}, (1951)

Species of fungus

Camarotella costaricensis is a plant pathogen.
