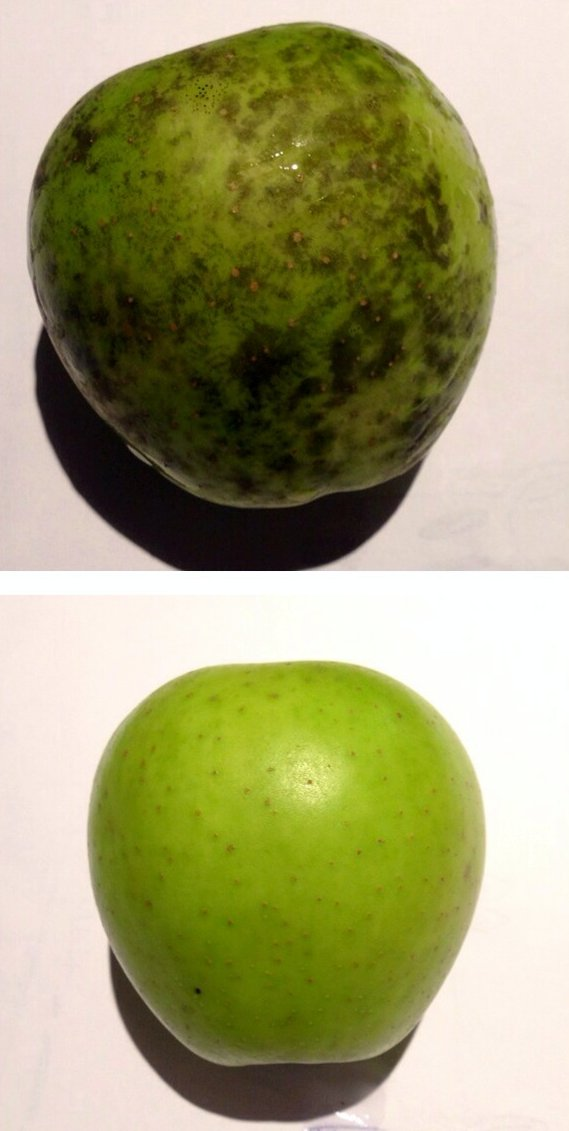
- An apple afflicted by Phyllachora pomigena before and after cleaning

Scientific classification
- Kingdom: Fungi
- Division: Ascomycota
- Class: Sordariomycetes
- Order: Phyllachorales
- Family: Phyllachoraceae
- Genus: Phyllachora
- Species: P. pomigena

Binomial name
- Phyllachora pomigena (Schwein.) Sacc., (1883)

Synonyms
- Dothidea pomigena Gloeodes pomigena Leptothyrella mali Marssonia coronariae Marssonia mali Marssonina mali

= Phyllachora pomigena =

Species of fungus

Phyllachora pomigena is a plant pathogen responsible for Sooty blotch and flyspeck disease, a disease affecting apples and pears. It appears as a brown or black blotch (1/4 inch (6.4 mm) in diameter) on the fruit. Spots may coalesce to cover the entire fruit. During the summer these diseases develop during cool rainy weather, particularly in dense, unpruned trees with poor air circulation. Although unsightly, the fruit is still edible. The sooty blotch will wipe off of the fruit.
