= Kurt Lohwag =

Austrian botanist and mycologist (1913–1970)

Kurt Lohwag (1913–1970) was an Austrian botanist and mycologist. The son of the Austrian mycologist Heinrich Lohwag (1884 - 1945). He was educated at the University of Vienna. For much of his career, he worked at the Hochschule für Bodenkultur, Vienna.

He was honoured in 1970, when botanist Franz Petrak named a genus of fungi, Lohwagiella, which is now a synonym of Niesslia Auersw.
