= Rehmiomycella =

Scientific classification
- Kingdom: Fungi
- Division: Ascomycota
- Class: Sordariomycetes
- Family: incertae sedis
- Genus: Rehmiomycella; E. Müll.

Genus of fungi

Rehmiomycella is a genus of fungi within the class Sordariomycetes. The relationship of this taxon to other taxa within the class is unknown (incertae sedis).
