= Rytidosperma penicillatum =

Scientific classification
- Kingdom: Plantae
- Clade: Tracheophytes
- Clade: Angiosperms
- Clade: Monocots
- Clade: Commelinids
- Order: Poales
- Family: Poaceae
- Genus: Rytidosperma
- Species: R. penicillatum

Binomial name
- Rytidosperma penicillatum (Labill.) Connor & Edgar

Species of plant

Rytidosperma penicillatum is a species of true grass in the subfamily Danthonioideae. It is indigenous to Australia and naturalised in New Zealand and Hawaii, USA. It was described as Arundo penicillata in 1850 by French botanist Jacques Labillardière.

== Description ==
=== Identification ===
As a Rytidosperma, the easiest way to identify R. penicillatum is to select a single floret (which will contain a single awn, two lateral lobes, and usually three rows of hairs - one on the callus and two on the lemma). The arrangement of the hairs, as well as the relative lengths of the awn, lateral lobes, sometimes the callus can help identify to species, using a key such as that found in the New Zealand Flora.

== Distribution ==
R. penicillatum is naturalized on Maui in Hawaii. It is currently known from East Maui and western and northern Mauna Kea. It may have arrived within 12 accessions of Rytidosperma imported by the Hawaii Agricultural Experiment Station (HAES) from 1913–1937. The oldest specimen is a volunteer in a grass garden (BISH 448988) from 1938, but it may have been accidentally introduced in hay, as it was “common in [a] pasture” in 1944 (Hosaka 2675).

== Ecology ==
The rust fungus Uromyces danthoniae, a species found that grows parasitically on the leaves of several Rytidosperma species in New Zealand and Australia, infects Rytidosperma penicillatum. It forms dense clusters of orange-brown aecidia on both surfaces of the leaf.

It is also a host of Sphaerodothella danthoniae, a sac fungus that produces black, shiny leaf spots that occasionally coalesce into straight to irregular lines in the leaf surface of several species of Rytidosperma.

== Taxonomy ==
=== Etymology ===
Rytidosperma: 'wrinkled seed' from the Greek 'rhytidos' = wrinkled and 'sperma' = seed
