= Diatractium =

Scientific classification
- Kingdom: Fungi
- Division: Ascomycota
- Class: Sordariomycetes
- Order: Phyllachorales
- Family: Phyllachoraceae
- Genus: Diatractium; Syd. & P. Syd.

Type species
- Diatractium cordiae (F. Stevens) Syd. & P. Syd.

Genus of fungi

Diatractium is a genus of fungi in the family Phyllachoraceae.
