= Albrecht Zimmermann =

German botanist and mycologist (1860–1931)

Philipp Wilhelm Albrecht Zimmermann (23 April 1860, in Braunschweig – 22 February 1931, in Berlin) was a German botanist. He was a professor of botany at several different Universities (such as Leipzig and Tübingen). He was a botanist and collector of fungi and spermatophytes, who worked in Indonesia and Tanzania from 1902 to 1919. He moved to Indonesia in 1896 and studied applied botany. In 1902, he moved to Africa to join the Amani Research Institute, which had been established that year. He returned to Germany in 1920, after World War I. He wrote about coffee cultivation and other botanical subjects, but most of his writings were destroyed during World War II.

== Works ==
- Der Kaffee, Deutscher Auslandsverlag, 1926, 204 p.
- Botanical microtechnique, 1893, (translated by J. E. Humphrey) 296 p.

== Honours ==
He has been honoured in the naming of several plant taxa including;

- Zimmermanniella which is a genus of fungi in the family Phyllachoraceae by Paul Christoph Hennings in 1902.
- Neozimmermannia by Sijfert Hendrik Koorders in 1907, (a genus of fungi) which is now a synonym for Colletotrichum gloeosporioides (in Glomerellaceae family)
- Zimmermannia by Ferdinand Albin Pax in 1910, (a genus of Euphorbiaceae, Phyllanthaceae) which is a synonym of Meineckia.
- Zimmermanniopsis by Alan Radcliffe-Smith in 1990 (another genus of Euphorbiaceae, Phyllanthaceae) which is also a synonym of Meineckia.
