= Tamsiniella =

Scientific classification
- Kingdom: Fungi
- Division: Ascomycota
- Class: Sordariomycetes
- Family: incertae sedis
- Genus: Tamsiniella; S.W. Wong, K.D. Hyde, W.H. Ho & S.J. Stanley

Genus of fungi

Tamsiniella is a genus of fungi within the class Sordariomycetes. The relationship of this taxon to other taxa within the class is unknown (incertae sedis).
