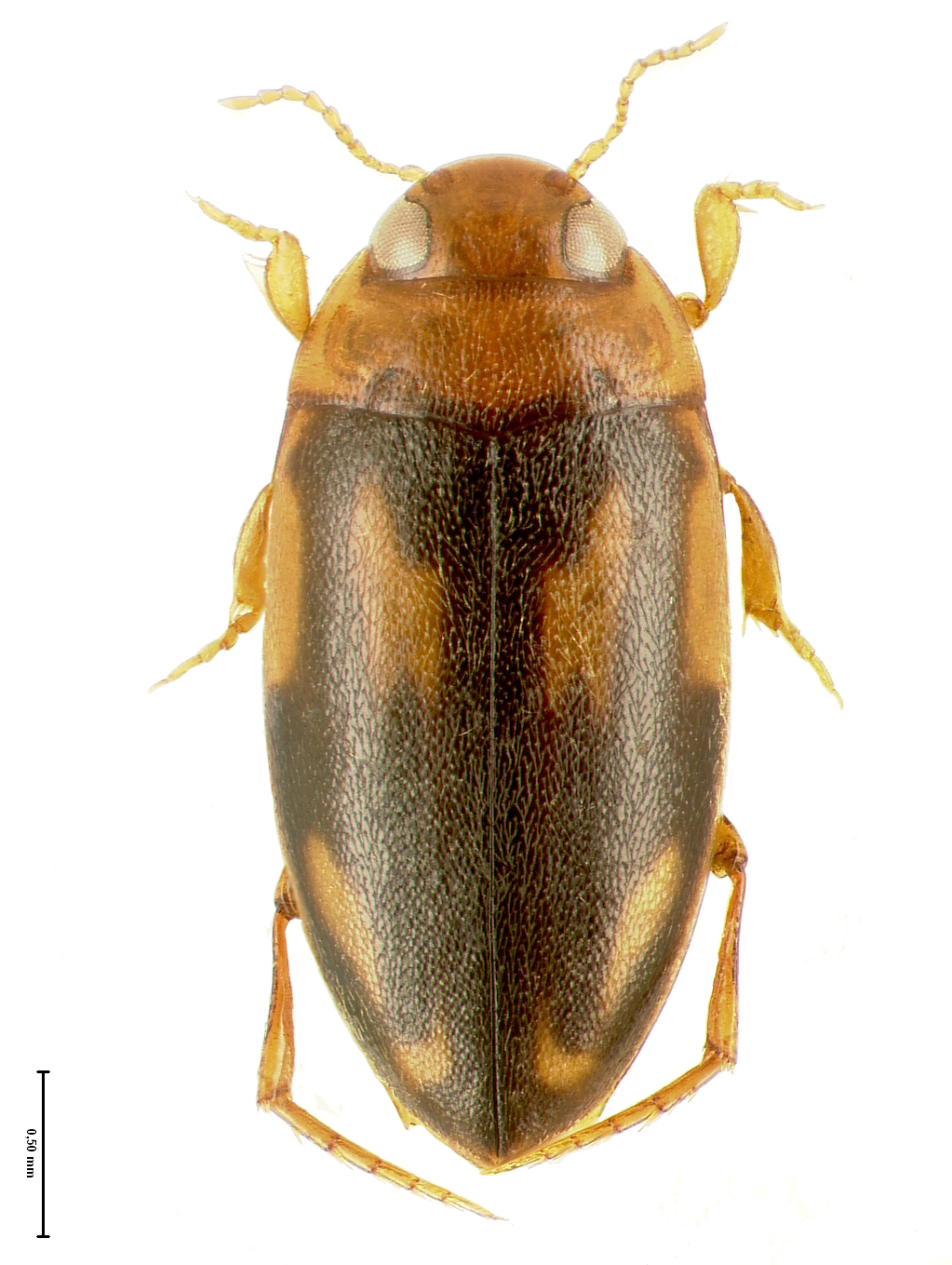
- Habitus dorsal of Dytiscidae: Neobidessodes denticulatus

Scientific classification
- Kingdom: Animalia
- Phylum: Arthropoda
- Class: Insecta
- Order: Coleoptera
- Suborder: Adephaga
- Family: Dytiscidae
- Genus: Bidessodes; Régimbart, 1895

= Bidessodes =

Genus of beetles

Bidessodes is a genus of beetles in the family Dytiscidae. It is found in the Neotropics.
