= Phaeochoraceae =

Scientific classification
- Kingdom: Fungi
- Division: Ascomycota
- Class: Sordariomycetes
- Order: Phyllachorales
- Family: Phaeochoraceae; K.D. Hyde, P.F. Cannon & M.E. Barr 1997

Type genus
- Phaeochora Höhn. 1909

Family of fungi

Phaeochoraceae is a family of sac fungi in the order Phyllachorales.

== Genera ==
(with amount of species per genera)

- Cocoicola K.D. Hyde (5)
- Phaeochora Höhn. (4)
- Phaeochoropsis K.D. Hyde & P.F. Cannon (4)
- Serenomyces Petr. (4)
