= Jules Aimé Battandier =

French botanist

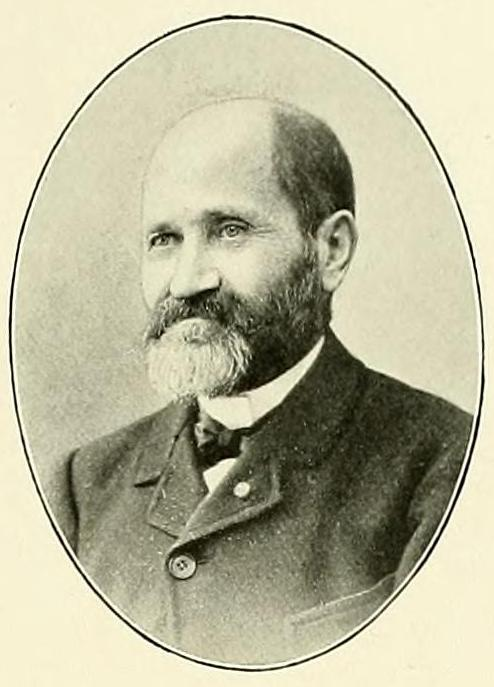
Jules Aimé Battandier (1848-1922)

Jules Aimé Battandier (28 January 1848 – 18 September 1922) was a French botanist who was a native of Annonay, department of Ardèche. He was an authority on Algerian flora.

In 1875, he became head of the pharmacy at Mustapha Pacha hospital, and in 1879 was a professor to the faculty of medicine and pharmacy in Algiers. He has several botanical species named after him, including Cytisus battandieri, commonly known as the Moroccan broom.

== Selected publications ==
- Atlas de la flore d'Algerie (Atlas on the flora of Algeria); five booklets, (1886-1920)
  - Flore d'Algerie (1888) (with Louis Charles Trabut)
- Algérie: Plantes médicinales, essences et parfums (Algeria: Herbs, essences and perfumes), (1889)
- L'Algérie. Le sol et les habitants. Flore, faune, géologie, anthropologie, ressources agricoles et économiques ((Algeria, the land and its people, Flora, fauna, geology, anthropology, agricultural resources and economics), with Louis Charles Trabut (1853-1929); (1898).
