= Franz Petrak =

Austrian-Czech mycologist (1886–1973)

- Born: October 9, 1886; Mährisch-Weißkirchen, Austria
- Died: October 9, 1973 (aged 87); Vienna, Austria
- Education: University of Vienna
- Scientific career
- Fields: Botany, Mycology
- Author abbrev. (botany): Petr.

Franz Petrak (9 October 1886 in Mährisch-Weißkirchen – 9 October 1973 in Vienna) was an Austrian-Czech mycologist.

From 1906 to 1910, he studied botany at the University of Vienna, where he was a student of Richard Wettstein. In 1913, he obtained his doctorate of sciences, and until 1916, worked as a high school teacher in Vienna. During World War I, he was stationed in Galicia and Albania, where he collected specimens in his spare time. From 1918 to 1938, he worked as a private scientist in his home town, and from 1938 to 1951, was associated with the Naturhistorisches Museum in Vienna.

He was the author of nearly 500 published works, primarily in the field of mycology. Much of his mycological work was published in the journal Annales mycologici and its successor Sydowia. Reportedly, his private herbarium contained 100,000 specimens. Starting from 1908 until 1970 he edited altogether fourteen exsiccatae by distributing large sets of fungal and plant specimens. Among them are the exsiccata-like series Fungi Eichleriani (Mycotheca Eichleriana) (1908–1912) which distributed material collected by Gustav Adolf Ferdinand Eichler and the exsiccata Cirsiotheca universa (1908–1927).

As a taxonomist, he described numerous species within the genus Cirsium (family Asteraceae). The mycological genera of; Petrakia Syd. & P.Syd. 1913 (family Pseudodidymellaceae), Petrakiella Syd. 1924 (Phyllachoraceae), Franzpetrakia Thirum. & Pavgi 1957 (Ustilaginaceae), Petrakiopeltis Bat., A.F.Vital & Cif. 1958 (Microthyriaceae), Petrakiopsis Subram. & K.R.C.Reddy 1968 (Ascomycota) and Petrakina (family Asterinaceae) have all been named in his honor, the latter genus being circumscribed by Raffaele Ciferri in 1932.

Franz Petrak died 9 October 1973 in Vienna.

== Selected works ==
- Die nordamerikanischen Arten der Gattung Cirsium, 1917.
- Die Gattungen der Pyrenomyzeten, Sphaeropsideen und Melanconiee, 1926.
- Die phaeosporen Shaeropsideen und die Gattung Macrophoma, 1926.
- "Index of fungi. Petrak's lists, 1920–1939". Cumulative index by the Commonwealth Mycological Institute (Great Britain), 1956.
- "Index of fungi : list of new species and varieties of fungi, new combinations and new names published 1920–1939", 1957.
- "Index of fungi: a supplement to Petrak's lists, 1920–1939". By the Commonwealth Mycological Institute (Great Britain), 1969.

== See also ==
- Category:Taxa named by Franz Petrak
- List of mycologists
