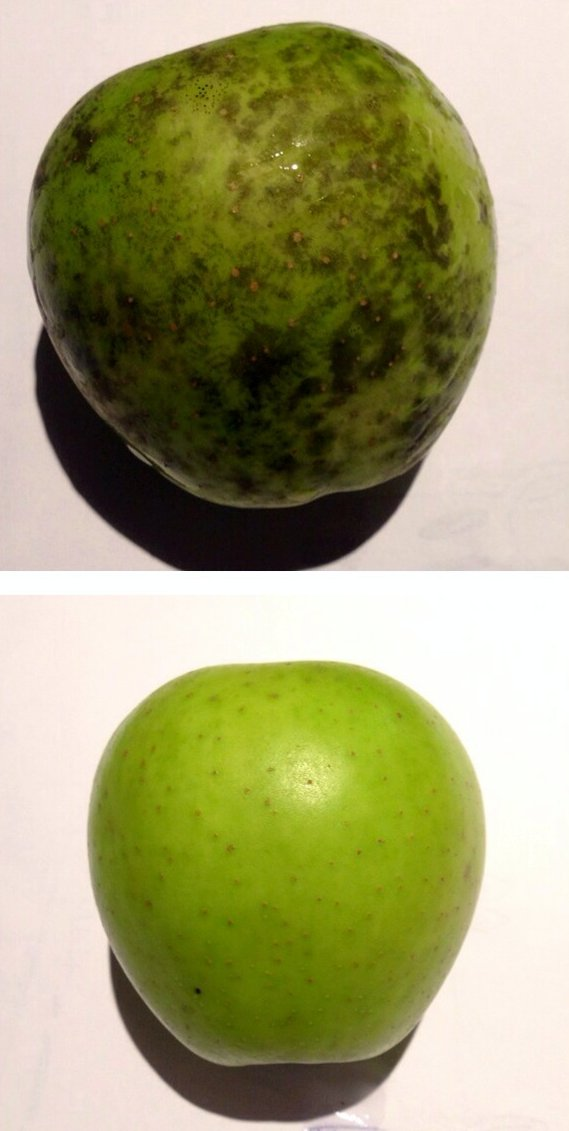
- An apple afflicted by Phyllachora pomigena before and after cleaning

Scientific classification
- Kingdom: Fungi
- Division: Ascomycota
- Class: Sordariomycetes
- Order: Phyllachorales
- Family: Phyllachoraceae; Theiss. & H. Syd., 1915

Type genus
- Phyllachora Nitschke ex Fuckel

Genera
- See text

= Phyllachoraceae =

Family of fungi

Phyllachoraceae is a family of sac fungi.

== Genera ==
As accepted by 2020 Outline (with amount of species per genus);

- Apiosphaeria (Speg.) Höhn. (8)
- Ascovaginospora Fallah, Shearer & W.D. Chen (1)
- Brobdingnagia K.D. Hyde & P.F. Cannon (4)
- Camarotella Theiss. & Syd. (8)
- Coccodiella Hara (27)
- Cyclodomus Höhn. (5)
- Deshpandiella Kamat & Ullasa (1)
- Diachora Müll. Arg. (4)
- Diatractium Syd. & P. Syd. (4)
- Erikssonia Penz. & Sacc. (5)
- Fremitomyces P.F. Cannon & H.C. Evans (2)
- Geminispora Pat. (2)
- Gibellina Pass. Ex Roum. (2)
- Imazekia Tak. Kobay. & Y. Kawabe (1)
- Isothea Fr. (4)
- Lichenochora Hafellner (44)
- Lindauella Rehm (1)
- Linochora Höhn. (37)
- Lohwagia Petr. (3)
- Maculatifrondes K.D. Hyde (1)
- Malthomyces K.D. Hyde & P.F. Cannon (2)
- Muelleromyces Kamat & Anahosur (1)
- Neoflageoletia J. Reid & C. Booth (1)
- Neophyllachora Dayar. & K.D. Hyde (4)
- Ophiodothella (Henn.). Höhn. (31)
- Ophiodothis Sacc. (6)
- Orphnodactylis Malloch & Mallik (2)
- Oxodeora K.D. Hyde & P.F. Cannon (1)
- Parberya C.A. Pearce & K.D. Hyde (2)
- Petrakiella Syd. (1)
- Phycomelaina Kohlm. (1)
- Phyllachora Nitschke ex Fuckel (1513)
- Phylleutypa Petr. (3)
- Phyllocrea Höhn. (3)
- Pseudothiella Petr. (1)
- Pseudothiopsella Petr. (1)
- Pterosporidium W.H. Ho & K.D. Hyde (2)
- Rehmiodothis Theiss. & Syd. (10)
- Retroa P.F. Cannon (2)
- Rhodosticta Woron. (2)
- Rikatlia P.F. Cannon (1)
- Schizochora Syd. & P. Syd. (3)
- Sphaerodothella C.A. Pearce & K.D. Hyde (1)
- Sphaerodothis (Sacc. & P. Syd.) Shear (43)
- Stigmatula (Sacc.) Syd. & P. Syd. (10)
- Stigmochora Theiss. & Syd. (12)
- Stromaster Höhn. (1)
- Tamsiniella S.W. Wong, K.D. Hyde, W.H. Ho & S.J. Stanley (1)
- Telimenella Petr. (3)
- Telimenochora Sivan. (1)
- Trabutia Sacc. & Roum. (1)
- Tribulatia J.E. Taylor, Hyde & E.B.G. Jones (1)
- Trabutiella (Henn.) Theiss. & Syd. (3)
- Uropolystigma Maubl. (1)
- Vitreostroma P.F. Cannon (3)
- Zimmermanniella Henn. (1)

== See also ==
- Camarotella costaricensis
