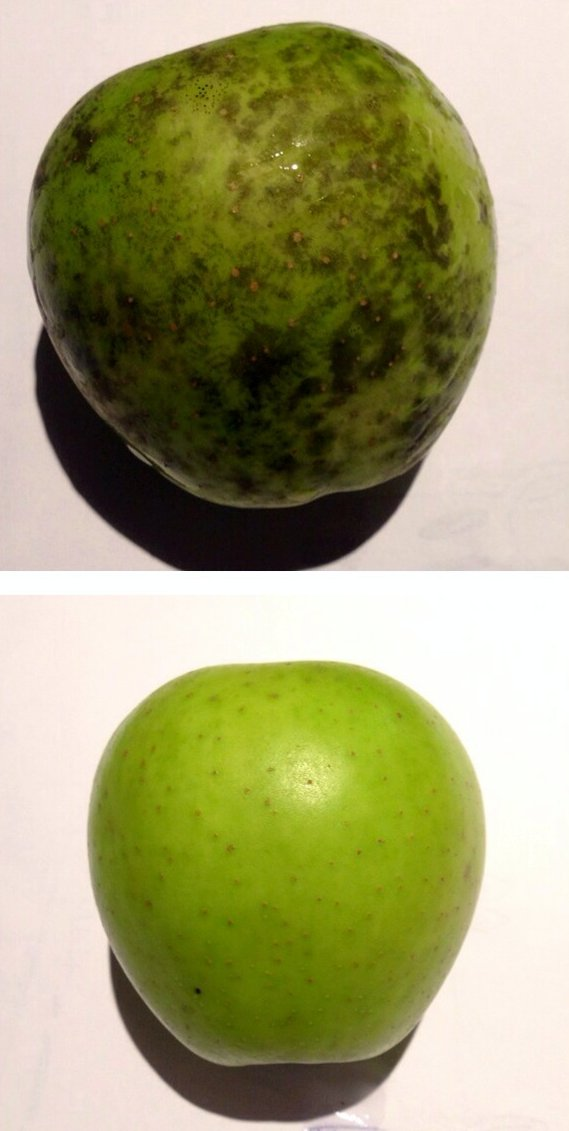
- An apple afflicted by Phyllachora pomigena before and after cleaning

Scientific classification
- Kingdom: Fungi
- Division: Ascomycota
- Class: Sordariomycetes
- Order: Phyllachorales; M.E. Barr, 1983

Families
- Phaeochoraceae; Phaeochorellaceae; Phyllachoraceae

= Phyllachorales =

Order of fungi

Phyllachorales is a small order of perithecial sac fungi containing mostly foliar parasites. This order lacks reliable morphological characters making taxonomic placement of genera difficult. There is controversy among mycologists as to the boundaries of this order. Family Phaeochorellaceae was added in 2020.

== Characteristics ==
In general, members of the Phyllachoraceae produce an ascocarp embedded in the host tissue, mostly within a stroma or beneath an epidermal clypeus. The type of development is ascohymenial.

== Genera incertae sedis ==
- Cyclodomus
- Lichenochora
- Maculatifrondes
- Mangrovispora
- Palmomyces
- Phycomelaina
- Uropolystigma
