= List of fungi of South Africa =

This is a list of the lists of fungal taxa as recorded from South Africa. Names given are as provided by the source, but authorities and dates should be aligned with current practice where feasible. Currently accepted names have been appended where the listed name is out of date.

A fungus (plural: fungi or funguses) is any member of the group of eukaryotic organisms that includes microorganisms such as yeasts and molds, as well as the more familiar mushrooms. These organisms are classified as a kingdom, separately from the other eukaryotic kingdoms, those being Plantae, Animalia, Protozoa, and Chromista.

A characteristic that places fungi in a different kingdom from plants, bacteria, and some protists is chitin in their cell walls. Fungi, like animals, are heterotrophs; they acquire their food by absorbing dissolved molecules, typically by secreting digestive enzymes into their environment. Fungi do not photosynthesize. Growth is their means of mobility, except for spores (a few of which are flagellated), which may travel through the air or water. Fungi are the principal decomposers in ecological systems. These and other differences place fungi in a single group of related organisms, named the Eumycota (true fungi or Eumycetes), which share a common ancestor (from a monophyletic group), an interpretation that is also strongly supported by molecular phylogenetics. This fungal group is distinct from the structurally similar myxomycetes (slime molds) and oomycetes (water molds). The discipline of biology devoted to the study of fungi is known as mycology (from the Greek μύκης mykes, mushroom). In the past, mycology was regarded as a branch of botany, although it is now known fungi are genetically more closely related to animals than to plants.

Abundant worldwide, most fungi are inconspicuous because of the small size of their structures, and their cryptic lifestyles in soil or on dead matter. Fungi include symbionts of plants, animals, or other fungi and also parasites. They may become noticeable when fruiting, either as mushrooms or as molds. Fungi perform an essential role in the decomposition of organic matter and have fundamental roles in nutrient cycling and exchange in the environment. They have long been used as a direct source of human food, in the form of mushrooms and truffles; as a leavening agent for bread; and in the fermentation of various food products, such as wine, beer, and soy sauce. Since the 1940s, fungi have been used for the production of antibiotics, and, more recently, various enzymes produced by fungi are used industrially and in detergents. Fungi are also used as biological pesticides to control weeds, plant diseases and insect pests. Many species produce bioactive compounds called mycotoxins, such as alkaloids and polyketides, that are toxic to animals including humans. The fruiting structures of a few species contain psychotropic compounds and are consumed recreationally or in traditional spiritual ceremonies. Fungi can break down manufactured materials and buildings, and become significant pathogens of humans and other animals. Losses of crops due to fungal diseases (e.g., rice blast disease) or food spoilage can have a large impact on human food supplies and local economies.

The fungus kingdom encompasses an enormous diversity of taxa with varied ecologies, life cycle strategies, and morphologies ranging from unicellular aquatic chytrids to large mushrooms. However, little is known of the true biodiversity of Kingdom Fungi, which has been estimated at 2.2 million to 3.8 million species. Of these, only about 148,000 have been described, with over 8,000 species known to be detrimental to plants and at least 300 that can be pathogenic to humans. Ever since the pioneering 18th and 19th century taxonomical works of Carl Linnaeus, Christiaan Hendrik Persoon, and Elias Magnus Fries, fungi have been classified according to their morphology (e.g., characteristics such as spore color or microscopic features) or physiology. Advances in molecular genetics have opened the way for DNA analysis to be incorporated into taxonomy, which has sometimes challenged the historical groupings based on morphology and other traits. Phylogenetic studies published in the first decade of the 21st century have helped reshape the classification within Kingdom Fungi, which is divided into one subkingdom, seven phyla, and ten subphyla.

== K ==
Genus: Kalchbrennera Berk. 1876, accepted as Lysurus Fr., (1823)

- Kalchbrennera corallocephala (Welw. & Curr.) Kalchbr. 1880 accepted as Lysurus corallocephalus Welw. & Curr., (1868)
- Kalchbrennera tuckii Berk. 1876
- Kalchbrennera tuckii var. microcephala Pole Evans*

Genus: Kloeckerospora*

- Kloeckerospora uvarum Niehaus*

Genus: Kretzschmaria Fr. 1849

- Kretzschmaria cetrarioides (Welw. & Curr.) Sacc. 1883
- Kretzschmaria knysnana Van der Byl 1932
- Kretzschmaria micropus (Fr.) Sacc. 1882

Genus: Kuehneola Magnus 1898

- Kuehneola albida (J.G.Kühn) Magnus (1898), accepted as Kuehneola uredinis (Link) Arthur (1906)
- Kuehneola fici (Castagne) E.J. Butler 1914 accepted as Cerotelium fici (Castagne) Arthur, (1917)
- Kuehneola uredinis (Link) Arthur (1906) recorded as Kuehneola albida (J.G.Kühn) Magnus (1898),

Genus: Kupsura Lloyd 1924, accepted as Lysurus Fr., (1823)

- Kupsura sphaerocephala Lloyd 1924

== N ==
Genus: Naemacyclus Fuckel 1874

- Naemacyclus niveus (Pers.) Fuckel ex Sacc. 1884 accepted as Cyclaneusma niveum (Pers.) DiCosmo, Peredo & Minter, (1983)

Genus: Naevia Fr. 1824, accepted as Arthonia Ach., (1806)

- Naevia rotundata Vain. 1901

Genus: Naucoria (Fr.) P.Kumm. (1871), accepted as Alnicola Kühner (1926)

- Naucoria arenicola (Berk.) Sacc. 1887 accepted as Agrocybe pediades (Fr.) Fayod, (1889)
- Naucoria arvalis Quel. [sic] possibly (Fr.) Sacc. 1887, accepted as Agrocybe arvalis (Fr.) Singer, (1936)
- Naucoria furfuracea Quel. [sic] possibly (Pers.) P. Kumm. 1871, accepted as Tubaria furfuracea (Pers.) Gillet, [1878]
- Naucoria pediades Quel. [sic] possibly (Fr.) P. Kumm. 1871, accepted as Agrocybe pediades (Fr.) Fayod, (1889)
- Naucoria pediades var. obscuripes Fayod 1890 accepted as Agrocybe pediades (Fr.) Fayod, (1889)
- Naucoria pygmaea (Bull.) Gillet 1876 accepted as Psathyrella pygmaea (Bull.) Singer, (1951)
- Naucoria russa (Cooke & Massee) Sacc. 1887
- Naucoria scolecina (Fr.) Quél. 1875
- Naucoria semiorbicularis (Bull.) Quél. 1875 accepted as Agrocybe pediades (Fr.) Fayod, (1889)
- Naucoria undulosa (Fr.) Sacc. 1887

Genus: Nectria (Fr.) Fr. 1849

- Nectria cinnabarina (Tode) Fr. 1849
- Nectria coccinea (Pers.) Fr. 1849
- Nectria coccophila (Tul. & C. Tul.) Wollenw. & Reinking 1935 accepted as Cosmospora flammea (Berk. & Ravenel) Rossman & Samuels, (1999)
- Nectria ditissima Tul. & C. Tul. (1865), accepted as Neonectria ditissima (Tul. & C. Tul.) Samuels & Rossman (2006)
- Nectria episphaeria (Tode) Fr. 1849, accepted as Dialonectria episphaeria (Tode) Cooke [as episphærica], (1884)
- Nectria eximia Kalchbr. & Cooke 1880
- Nectria furfuracea Kalchbr. & Cooke 1880
- Nectria galligena Bres. 1901 [as gallingena] accepted as Neonectria ditissima (Tul. & C. Tul.) Samuels & Rossman, (2006)
- Nectria heterosperma Kalchbr. & Cooke 1880
- Nectria leocarpoides Kalchbr. & Cooke 1880
- Nectria martialis Kalchbr. & Cooke 1880
- Nectria meliolopsidicola Henn. 1895 [as mellopsicola] accepted as Cosmospora meliolopsidicola (Henn.) Rossman & Samuels [as 'meliopsicola'], (1999)
- Nectria perpusilla Sacc. 1913, Nom. illegit.
- Nectria peziza (Tode) Fr. 1849
- Nectria sp.

Family:Nectrioidaceae Sacc. 1884

Genus: Nematospora Peglion 1897

- Nematospora coryli Peglion, 1901, accepted as Eremothecium coryli Kurtzman, 1995
- Nematospora gossypii Ashby & Nowell (1926), accepted as Eremothecium gossypii Kurtzman, 1995

Genus: Nematostigma Syd. & P. Syd. 1913

- Nematostigma obducens Syd. & P. Syd. 1913,

Genus: Neobarclaya Kuntze 1898

- Neobarclaya congesta (Berk. & Broome) Petch 1924 accepted as Deshpandiella jambolana (T.S. Ramakr., Sriniv. & Sundaram) Kamat & Ullasa, (1973)
- Neobarclaya natalensis P. Syd. 1899 accepted as Deshpandiella jambolana (T.S. Ramakr., Sriniv. & Sundaram) Kamat & Ullasa, (1973)

Genus: Neocosmospora E.F. Sm. 1899 accepted as Fusarium Link, (1809)

- Neocosmospora vasinfecta E.F. Sm. 1899 accepted as Fusarium neocosmosporiellum O'Donnell & Geiser, (2013)
- Neocosmospora vasinifecta var. tracheiphila E.F. Sm. 1899 accepted as Fusarium neocosmosporiellum O'Donnell & Geiser, (2013)

Genus: Neopeckia Sacc. 1883

- Neopeckia caesalpiniae Doidge 1948 accepted as Herpotrichia caesalpiniae (Doidge) Sivan., (1972)
- Neopeckia rhodostoma Syd. & P. Syd. 1917

Genus: Nephroma Ach. 1809(Lichens)

- Nephroma africanum Gyeln. 1931
- Nephroma capense A. Massal. 1861
- Nephroma cellulosum (Sm.) Ach. 1810
- Nephroma flavireagens Gyeln. 1931
- Nephroma helveticum Ach. 1810
- Nephroma laevigatum Ach. 1814
- Nephroma resupinatum f. helveticum Rabenh. 1845
- Nephroma tropicum (Müll. Arg.) Zahlbr. 1925

Genus: Nephromium Nyl. 1860, accepted as Nephroma Ach., (1809)

- Nephromium helveticum (Ach.) Nyl. 1888 accepted as Nephroma helveticum Ach. [as helvetica], (1810)
- Nephromium tropicum Müll. Arg. 1883
- Nephromium laevigatum (Ach.) Nyl. 1858 accepted as Nephroma laevigatum Ach. [as laevigata], (1814)

Genus: Nesolechia A. Massal. 1856 accepted as Phacopsis Tul., (1852)

- Nesolechia perforans (Stizenb.) Vouaux 1913;

Family: Nidulariaceae Dumort. 1822

Genus: Nidularia Fr. 1817

- Nidularia dasypus (Nees) Fr. 1823

Genus: Nigrospora Zimm. 1902

- Nigrospora oryzae (Berk. & Broome) Petch (1924),
- Nigrospora panici Zimm. 1902
- Nigrospora sphaerica (Sacc.) E.W. Mason 1927 accepted as Nigrospora oryzae (Berk. & Broome) Petch (1924)

Genus: Niopsora A. Massal. 1861, accepted as Caloplaca Th. Fr., (1860)

- Niopsora ecklonii A. Massal. 1861

Genus: Niorma A. Massal. 1861

- Niorma derelicta A. Massal. 1861

Genus: Nolanea (Fr.) P. Kumm. 1871

- Nolanea casta (MacOwan) Sacc. 1887 accepted as Mycena casta (MacOwan) D.A. Reid, (1975)
- Nolanea leuciscus Kalchbr.*

Genus: Normandina Nyl. 1855

- Normandina pulchella (Borrer) Nyl. 1861

Genus: Nummularia Tul. & C. Tul. 1863 accepted as Biscogniauxia Kuntze, (1891)

- Nummularia clypeus (Schwein.) Cooke 1883 accepted as Biscogniauxia mediterranea (De Not.) Kuntze, (1891)
- Nummularia kalchbrenneri (Sacc.) J.H. Mill. 1942, accepted as Biscogniauxia kalchbrenneri (Sacc.) Y.M. Ju & J.D. Rogers, (1998)
- Nummularia lepida Syd. 1924 accepted as Biscogniauxia kalchbrenneri (Sacc.) Y.M. Ju & J.D. Rogers, (1998)
- Nummularia placenta Cooke accepted as Biscogniauxia kalchbrenneri (Sacc.) Y.M. Ju & J.D. Rogers, (1998)
- Nummularia punctulata (Berk. & Ravenel) Sacc. 1882 [as punctulatum] accepted as Camillea punctulata (Berk. & Ravenel) Læssøe, J.D. Rogers & Whalley, (1989)
- Nummularia suborbicularis (Welw. & Curr.) Sacc. 1882, [as suborbiculare]
- Nummularia uniapiculata Penz. & Sacc. [as uni-apiculata], (1898) accepted as Biscogniauxia uniapiculata (Penz. & Sacc.) Whalley & Læssøe, (1990)

== O ==
=== Oc ===
Genus: Ocellularia G. Mey. 1825 (Lichens)

- Ocellularia capensis var. feracior Zahlbr. 1932
- Ocellularia capensis var. leiothallina Zahlbr. 1932
- Ocellularia cavata (Ach.) Müll. Arg. 1882
- Ocellularia diploschistoides Zahlbr. 1932
- Ocellularia galactina Zahlbr. 1932
- Ocellularia henatomma (Ach.) Müll. Arg. 1887

Genus: Ochrolechia A.Massal. (1852) (Lichens)

- Ochrolechia africana Vain. 1926
- Ochrolechia africana Vain. 1926
- Ochrolechia pallescens (L.) A. Massal. 1853
- Ochrolechia parella (L.) A. Massal. 1852

Genus: Octaviania Vittad. 1831

- Octaviania africana Lloyd 1922 accepted as Neosecotium africanum (Lloyd) Singer & A.H. Sm., (1960)
- Octaviania carnea (Wallr.) Corda 1854 accepted as Hydnangium carneum Wallr., (1839)
- Octaviania flava G.H.Cunn. accepted as Stephanospora flava (Rodway) G.W. Beaton, Pegler & T.W.K. Young, (1985)

=== Od ===
Genus: Odontia Pers. 1794

- Odontia arguta (Fr.) Quél. 1888 accepted as Hyphodontia arguta (Fr.) J. Erikss., (1958)
- Odontia knysnana Van der Byl 1934 accepted as Xylodon knysnanus (Van der Byl) Hjortstam & Ryvarden, (2009)
- Odontia saccharicola Burt 1917 accepted as Resinicium saccharicola (Burt) Nakasone, (2000)

=== Oi ===
Genus: Oidiopsis Scalia 1902 accepted as Leveillula G. Arnaud, (1921)

- Oidiopsis taurica (Lév.) E.S. Salmon 1906 accepted as Leveillula taurica (Lév.) G. Arnaud, (1921)

Genus: Oidium Link 1824

- Oidium abelmoschi Thüm. 1878 accepted as Fibroidium abelmoschi (Thüm.) U. Braun & R.T.A. Cook, (2012)
- Oidium chrysanthemi Rabenh. 1853 accepted as Golovinomyces chrysanthemi (Rabenh.) M. Bradshaw, U. Braun, Meeboon & S. Takam., (2017)
- Oidium erysiphoides Fr. (1832), accepted as Golovinomyces biocellatus (Ehrenb.) V.P. Heluta, (1988)
- Oidium farinosum Cooke (1887), accepted as Podosphaera leucotricha (Ellis & Everh.) E.S. Salmon, (1900)
- Oidium hortensiae Jørst. 1925 accepted as Pseudoidium hortensiae (Jørst. ex S. Blumer) U. Braun & R.T.A. Cook, (2012)
- Oidium lactis Fresen. 1850 accepted as Dipodascus geotrichum (E.E. Butler & L.J. Petersen) Arx, (1977)
- Oidium leuconium Desm. 1829 accepted as Podosphaera pannosa (Wallr.) de Bary, (1870)
- Oidium lycopersici Cooke & Massee, (1888) [as lycopersicum] accepted as Golovinomyces lycopersici (Cooke & Massee) L. Kiss, (2019)
- Oidium mangiferae Berthet 1914
- Oidium quercinum Thüm. 1878 accepted as Erysiphe alphitoides (Griffon & Maubl.) U. Braun & S. Takam., (2000)
- Oidium tabaci Thüm. 1879 accepted as Golovinomyces cichoracearum (DC.) V.P. Heluta [as 'cichoraceorum'], (1988)
- Oidium tuckeri Berk. 1847 accepted as Erysiphe necator Schwein., [1834]
- Oidium verbenae Thüm. & P.C. Bolle 1885 accepted as Acrosporium verbenae (Thüm. & P.C. Bolle) J.A. Stev., (1975)
- Oidium sp.

=== Ol ===
Genus: Olpidiopsis Cornu 1872

- Olpidiopsis ricciae du Plessis 1933

Genus: Oligostroma Syd. & P. Syd. 1914 accepted as Ramularia Unger, (1833)

- Oligostroma maculiformis (G. Winter) Doidge 1921 accepted as Teratosphaeria maculiformis (G. Winter) Joanne E. Taylor & Crous, (1999)
- Oligostroma proteae Syd. & P. Syd. 1914 accepted as Mycosphaerella proteae (Syd. & P. Syd.) Arx, (1962)

=== Om ===
Genus: Ombrophila Fr. 1849

- Ombrophila nigrescens Henn. 1902

Genus: Omphalia (Fr.) Gray 1821, accepted as Omphalina Quél., (1886)

- Omphalia bulbosa Bres. 1920
- Omphalia glaucophylla Gill. [sic] possibly (Lasch) Sacc. 1887
- Omphalia griseopallida Quel. [sic] possibly (Desm.) P. Karst. 1879 accepted as Arrhenia griseopallida (Desm.) Watling, [1988]
- Omphalia integrella Quel. [sic] possibly (Pers.) P. Kumm. 1871 accepted as Delicatula integrella (Pers.) Fayod, (1889)
- Omphalia linopus (Kalchbr.) Sacc. 1887
- Omphalia micromeles (Berk. & Broome) Sacc. 1887
- Omphalia oniscus (Fr.) Gillet 1876 accepted as Arrhenia oniscus (Fr.) Redhead, Lutzoni, Moncalvo & Vilgalys [as onisca], (2002)
- Omphalia pallescens Bres. 1920 accepted as Clitocybe torrendii Pegler, (1966)
- Omphalia paurophylla (Berk.) Sacc. 1891
- Omphalia polypus (Kalchbr.) Sacc. 1887 accepted as Marasmius polypus (Kalchbr.) D.A. Reid, (1975)
- Omphalia rustica (Fr.) Quél. 1872, accepted as Arrhenia rustica (Fr.) Redhead, Lutzoni, Moncalvo & Vilgalys, (2002)
- Omphalia scyphoides Quel. [sic] possibly (Fr.) P. Kumm. 1871, accepted as Clitopilus scyphoides (Fr.) Singer, (1946)
- Omphalia syndesmia (Kalchbr.) Sacc. 1887;
- Omphalia umbellifera Quel. var. cinnabarina Berk.*

Genus: Omphalaria Durieu & Mont. 1847 (?) accepted as Thyrea A. Massal., (1856)

- Omphalaria minuscula (Nyl.) Vain. 1901

Genus: Omphalodium Meyen & Flot. 1843 (?) (Lichens)

- Omphalodium hottentottum (Ach.) Flot. 1843 accepted as Xanthoparmelia hottentotta (Ach.) A. Thell, Feuerer, Elix & Kärnefelt, J. Hattori (2006)
- Omphalodium hottentottum var. phalacrum Hue 1900
- Omphalodium mutabile (Taylor) Minks 1900;

=== On ===
Genus: Oncospora Kalchbr. 1880

- Oncospora bullata Kalchbr. & Cooke 1880
- Oncospora viridans Kalchbr. & Cooke 1880

=== Oo ===
Genus: Oospora Wallr. 1833, accepted as Oidium Link, (1824)

- Oospora citri-aurantii (Ferraris) Sacc. & P. Syd. 1902accepted as Dipodascus geotrichum (E.E. Butler & L.J. Petersen) Arx, 336 (1977)
- Oospora fimicola (Costantin & Matr.) Cub. & Megliola 1903, accepted as Scopulariopsis coprophila (Cooke & Massee) W. Gams, (1971)
- Oospora fusidium (Thüm.) Sacc. & Voglino 1886
- Oospora lactis (Fresen.) Sacc. 1886 accepted as Dipodascus geotrichum (E.E. Butler & L.J. Petersen) Arx, (1977)
- Oospora pustulans M.N. Owen & Wakef. 1919 [as pustularis] accepted as Polyscytalum pustulans (M.N. Owen & Wakef.) M.B. Ellis, (1976)
- Oospora scabies Thaxt. 1892

Genus: Oothecium Speg. 1918, accepted as Asterostomella Speg., (1886)

- Oothecium consimile Syd. 1930
- Oothecium macarangae Petr. 1928 accepted as Capnodiastrum macarangae (Petr.) Petr., (1952)
- Oothecium stylosporum (Cooke) Doidge 1942 accepted as Capnodiastrum stylosporum (Cooke) Petr., (1952)

=== Op ===
Genus: Opegrapha (Lichens)

- Opegrapha adpicta Zahlbr. 1932
- Opegrapha agelaea Fée 1837
- Opegrapha atra Pers. 1794 accepted as Arthonia atra (Pers.) A. Schneid., (1898)
- Opegrapha bacillosa Zahlbr. 1936
- Opegrapha bonplandi Fée 1825
- Opegrapha capensis Müll. Arg. 1888
- Opegrapha diagraphoides Nyl. 1869
- Opegrapha diaphorella Stizenb. 1891
- Opegrapha emersa Müll. Arg. 1887 accepted as Lecanographa lyncea (Sm.) Egea & Torrente, (1994)
- Opegrapha exiguella Zahlbr. 1936 [as exigualla]
- Opegrapha exornata Zahlbr.
- Opegrapha interalbata Nyl. 1867
- Opegrapha lactifera Zahlbr. 1936
- Opegrapha lyncea (Sm.) Borrer ex Hook. 1833 accepted as Lecanographa lyncea (Sm.) Egea & Torrente, (1994)
- Opegrapha medusulina Nyl. 1895
- Opegrapha menyharthii Müll. Arg. 1893
- Opegrapha parvula Nyl. 1876
- Opegrapha prosodea var. microcarpella Zahlbr. 1936
- Opegrapha quaternella Nyl. f. congesta Stizenb.*
- Opegrapha scripta (L.) Ach. 1803 accepted as Graphis scripta (L.) Ach., (1809)
- Opegrapha semiatra Müll. Arg. 1886
- Opegrapha signatella Vain. 1926
- Opegrapha tapetica Zahlbr. 1932.
- Opegrapha ulcerata Müll. Arg. 1895
- Opegrapha zanei A. Massal. 1861

Genus: Ophiobolus Riess 1854

- Ophiobolus cariceti (Berk. & Broome) Sacc. (1883), accepted as Gaeumannomyces graminis var. graminis (Sacc.) Arx & D.L. Olivier, (1952)
- Ophiobolus graminis (Sacc.) Sacc. (1881), accepted as Gaeumannomyces graminis var. graminis (Sacc.) Arx & D.L. Olivier, (1952)
- Ophiobolus cariceti (Berk. & Broome) Sacc. 1883, accepted as Gaeumannomyces graminis (Sacc.) Arx & D.L. Olivier, (1952)
- Ophiobolus stipae Doidge 1941
- Ophiobolus urticae (Rabenh.) Sacc. 1883 accepted as Pseudoophiobolus erythrosporus (Riess) Phookamsak, Wanas., & K.D. Hyde, (2017)

Genus: Ophiodothella (Henn.) Höhn. 1910

- Ophiodothella edax (Berk. & Broome) Höhn. 1910
- Ophiodothella liebenbergii Doidge 1942

=== Or ===
Genus: Orbilia Fr. 1836

- Orbilia rubella (Pers.) P. Karst. 1871
- Orbilia xanthostigma (Fr.) Fr. 1849

Family: Orbiliaceae Nannf. 1932

=== Ot ===
Genus: Otthia Nitschke ex Fuckel 1870

- Otthia deformans Pat. 1918

=== Ov ===
Genus: Ovularia Sacc. 1880, accepted as Ramularia Unger, (1833)

- Ovularia bistorta (Fuckel) Sacc. 1886 accepted as Ramularia bistortae Fuckel, (1870)
- Ovularia lolii Volkart 1903 accepted as Ramularia lolii (Volkart) U. Braun, (1988)

Genus: OvulariopsisPat. & Har. 1900

- Ovulariopsis moricola Delacr. 1903
- Ovulariopsis papayae Van der Byl 1921 accepted as Phyllactinia papayae (Van der Byl) U. Braun, (2016)
- Ovulariopsis sp.

== V ==
=== Va ===
Genus: Valsa

- Valsa infinitissima Kalchbr. & Cooke 1880 accepted as Peroneutypella infinitissima (Kalchbr. & Cooke) Doidge, (1941)
- Valsa leucostoma (Pers.) Fr. 1849 accepted as Cytospora leucostoma (Pers.) Sacc., (1881)
- Valsa salicina (Pers.) Fr. 1849
- Valsa sordida Nitschke 1870 accepted as Cytospora chrysosperma (Pers.) Fr., (1823)
- Valsa stellulata (Fr.) Fr. 1849 accepted as Eutypella stellulata (Fr.) Sacc., (1882)

Family: Valsaceae Tul. & C. Tul. 1861

Genus: Valsaria Ces. & De Not. 1863

- Valsaria batesii Doidge, (1948), accepted as Valsaria insitiva (Tode) Ces. & De Not.,(1863)
- Valsaria eucalypti (Kalchbr. & Cooke) Sacc. 1882, accepted as Myrmaecium rubricosum (Fr.) Fuckel, (1870)
- Valsaria natalensis Doidge 1941

Family: Valseae

Genus: Varicellaria Nyl. 1858

- Varicellaria lactea (L.) I. Schmitt & Lumbsch, (2012) recorded as Variolaria lactea Wahlbg. [sic] possibly (L.) Pers. 1794

Genus: Variolaria

- Variolaria discoidea Pers. 1794 accepted as Lepra albescens (Huds.) Hafellner, (2016)
- Variolaria lactea Wahlbg. [sic] possibly (L.) Pers. 1794, accepted as Varicellaria lactea (L.) I. Schmitt & Lumbsch, (2012)

=== Ve ===
Genus: Venturia

- Venturia cephalariae (Auersw.) Kalchbr. & Cooke 1880
- Venturia inaequalis (Cooke) G. Winter 1875
- Venturia pyrina Aderh. (1896),

Genus: Vermicularia Tode 1790 accepted as Colletotrichum Corda, (1831)

- Vermicularia capsici Syd., (1913), accepted as Colletotrichum capsici (Syd.) E.J. Butler & Bisby, (1931)
- Vermicularia dematium (Pers.) Fr., (1829), accepted as Colletotrichum dematium (Pers.) Grove, (1918)
- Vermicularia dianthi Westend. (1867), accepted as Colletotrichum dematium (Pers.) Grove, (1918)
- Vermicularia herbarum Westend. 1849
- Vermicularia herbarum f. dianthi West. [sic] possibly var. dianthi (Westend.) Sacc. 1931 accepted as Colletotrichum dematium (Pers.) Grove, (1918)
- Vermicularia varians Ducomet 1908

Genus: Verrucaria Schrad. 1794? (Lichens)

- Verrucaria alba (Müll. Arg.) Stizenb. 1891
- Verrucaria albella (Müll. Arg.) Stizenb. 1891
- Verrucaria alboatra Kremp. 1867
- Verrucaria alboatra var. recepta (Müll. Arg.) Stizenb. 1891
- Verrucaria aspistea Afzel. ex Ach. 1803 accepted as Pyrenula aspistea (Afzel. ex Ach.) Ach., (1814)
- Verrucaria cinchonae Ach. 1814 accepted as Constrictolumina cinchonae (Ach.) Lücking, M.P. Nelsen & Aptroot, (2016)
- Verrucaria cinchonae var. fumida Stizenb. 1891
- Verrucaria clopima Wahlenb. 1809 accepted as Staurothele clopima (Wahlenb.) Th. Fr., (1861)
- Verrucaria confluxa (Müll. Arg.) Stizenb. 1891 accepted as Bogoriella confluens (Müll. Arg.) Aptroot & Lücking, (2016)
- Verrucaria dissipans Nyl. 1866
- Verrucaria erodens Müll. Arg. 1888
- Verrucaria eurysperma Stizenb. 1891
- Verrucaria fallax (Nyl.) Nyl. 1872 accepted as Pseudosagedia fallax (Nyl.) Oxner, (1956)
- Verrucaria ferruginosa (Müll. Arg.) Stizenb. 1891 accepted as Pyrenowilmsia ferruginosa (Müll. Arg.) Aptroot, (1991)
- Verrucaria glabrata var. incusa Flot. 1843
- Verrucaria leucanthes Stirt. 1877
- Verrucaria locuples Stizenb. 1891 accepted as Clathroporina locuples (Stizenb.) Zahlbr., (1922)
- Verrucaria microlepidea Zahlbr. 1932
- Verrucaria mierolepidea var. hilarior Zahlbr. 1932.
- Verrucaria nigrescens Pers. 1795
- Verrucaria nitida (Weigel) Schrad. 1801 accepted as Pyrenula nitida (Weigel) Ach., (1814)
- Verrucaria nitida var. nitidella Flörke 1815 accepted as Pyrenula nitida (Weigel) Ach., (1814)
- Verrucaria papulosa Nyl. 1867 accepted as Astrothelium papulosum (Nyl.) Aptroot & Lücking, (2016)
- Verrucaria pleiomeriza Nyl. 1895
- Verrucaria pyrenuloides (Mont.) Nyl. 1858, accepted as Pyrenula pyrenuloides (Mont.) R.C. Harris, (1989)
- Verrucaria rebellans Zahlbr. 1936
- Verrucaria santensis (Nyl.) Nyl. 1863 accepted as Pyrenula santensis (Nyl.) Müll. Arg., (1882)
- Verrucaria simulans (Müll. Arg.) Stizenb. 1891
- Verrucaria subducta Nyl. 1863
- Verrucaria tetracerae Afzel. [sic]possibly Ach. 1803 accepted as Porina tetracerae (Ach.) Müll. Arg., (1885)
- Verrucaria transwaalensis (Müll. Arg.) Stizenb., (1891) as ''transvaalensis''
- Verrucaria variolosa Mont. 1845
- Verrucaria viridula (Schrad.) Ach. 1803
- Verrucaria wilmsiana (Müll. Arg.) Stizenb. 1891

Family: Verrucariaceae Eschw. 1824

Genus: Verticillium Nees 1816

- Verticillium alboatrum Reinke & Berthold 1879,
- Verticillium pulvinulum Kalchbr. & Cooke 1882
- Verticillium terrestre (Pers.) Sacc. 1886
- Verticillium sp.

Genus: Vestergrenia Rehm 1901

- Vestergrenia chaenostoma (Sacc.) Theiss. 1918

=== Vo ===
Genus: Volutella Fr. 1832

- Volutella dianthi Atk.*
- Volutella sp.

Genus: Volvaria

- Volvaria bombycina Quel. [sic]possibly (Schaeff.) P. Kumm. 1871, accepted as Volvariella bombycina (Schaeff.) Singer, (1951)
- Volvaria eurhiza Petch.*
- Volvaria pusilla Quel. [sic] possibly (Pers.) Lloyd 1899, accepted as Volvariella pusilla (Pers.) Singer, (1951)
- Volvaria speciosa Gill. [sic] possibly (Fr.) P. Kumm. 1871, accepted as Volvopluteus gloiocephalus (DC.) Vizzini, Contu & Justo, (2011)
- Volvaria sp.

Genus: Volvariella Speg. 1898

- Volvariella bombycina (Schaeff.) Singer, (1951) recorded as Volvaria bombycina Quel. [sic]possibly (Schaeff.) P. Kumm. 1871
- Volvariella pusilla (Pers.) Singer, (1951) recorded as Volvaria pusilla Quel. [sic] possibly (Pers.) Lloyd 1899

Genus: Volvopluteus Vizzini, Contu & Justo 2011

- Volvopluteus gloiocephalus (DC.) Vizzini, Contu & Justo, (2011) recorded as Volvaria speciosa Gill. [sic] possibly (Fr.) P. Kumm. 1871

== W ==
Genus: Woodiella Sacc. & P. Syd. 1899,

- Woodiella natalensis Sacc. & P. Syd. (1899),

Family: Woroninaceae H.E. Petersen 1909

Genus: Woroninella Racib. 1898 accepted as Synchytrium de Bary & Woronin, (1863)

- Woroninella dolichi (Cooke) Syd. 1914 accepted as Synchytrium dolichi (Cooke) Gäum., (1927)

== X ==
=== Xa ===
Genus: Xanthoria (Fr.) Th. Fr. 1860,(Lichens)

- Xanthoria aureola (Ach.) Erichsen, (1930) reported as Xanthoria parietina var. aureola (Ach.) Th. Fr. 1860
- Xanthoria candelaria f. fibrillosa Hillmann 1922
- Xanthoria candelaria var. semigranularis (Müll. Arg.) Zahlbr. 1931
- Xanthoria ectaneoides (Nyl.) Zahlbr. 1931
- Xanthoria flammea (L. f.) Hillmann 1922 accepted as Dufourea flammea (L. f.) Ach., (1810)
- Xanthoria flammea var. podetiifera Hillmann 1922
- Xanthoria marlothii Zahlbr. 1926 accepted as Dufourea marlothii (Zahlbr.) Frödén, Arup & Søchting, (2013)
- Xanthoria parietina Beltr. [sic] possibly (L.) Th. Fr. 1860
- Xanthoria parietina f. albicans (Müll. Arg.) Hillmann 1961
- Xanthoria parietina f. rutilans Th. Fr. 1871
- Xanthoria parietina var. aureola (Ach.) Th. Fr. 1860 Accepted as Xanthoria aureola (Ach.) Erichsen, (1930)
- Xanthoria parietina var. ectanea (Ach.) J. Kickx f. 1867, accepted as Xanthoria parietina (L.) Th. Fr., (1860)
- Xanthoria parietina var. ectaneoides (Nyl.) Zahlbr. 1917 accepted as Xanthoria ectaneoides (Nyl.) Zahlbr. [as 'ectanoides'], (1931)
- Xanthoria parietina var. macrophylla (Stizenb.) Hillmann 1920
- Xanthoria turbinata Vain. 1900 accepted as Dufourea turbinata (Vain.) Frödén, Arup & Søchting, (2013)

=== Xe ===
Genus: Xerotus Fr. 1828

- Xerotus berteroi Mont. [as 'berteri'], (1850)
- Xerotus caffrorum Kalchbr. & MacOwan 1881 accepted as Collybia caffrorum (Kalchbr. & MacOwan) D.A. Reid, (1975)
- Xerotus fuliginosus Berk. & M.A. Curtis 1860
- Xerotus nigritus Lév. 1846 accepted as Anthracophyllum nigritum (Lév.) Kalchbr., (1881)

=== Xy ===
Genus: Xylaria Hill ex Schrank 1786

- Xylaria allantoidea (Berk.) Fr. 1851
- Xylaria anisopleura (Mont.) Fr. 1851
- Xylaria apiculata Cooke 1879
- Xylaria arbuscula Sacc. 1878
- Xylaria aristata Mont. 1856. accepted as Podosordaria aristata (Mont.) P.M.D. Martin, (1976)
- Xylaria bulbosa (Pers.) Berk. & Broome 1860
- Xylaria capensis (Lév.) Sacc. 1883
- Xylaria carpophila Pers. ex Fr.
- Xylaria castorea Berk. 1855
- Xylaria corniformis (Fr.) Fr. 1849
- Xylaria cubensis (Mont.) Fr. 1851
- Xylaria digitata (L.) Grev. 1825
- Xylaria doumetii (Pat.) J.H. Mill. 1942
- Xylaria ensata Kalch.*
- Xylaria fistulosa (Lév.) Fr. 1851
- Xylaria heloidea Penz. & Sacc. 1898 accepted as Podosordaria heloidea (Penz. & Sacc.) P.M.D. Martin, (1976)
- Xylaria hypoxylon (L.) Grev. 1824,
- Xylaria ippoglossa Speg. (1889) [as Hippoglossa]
- Xylaria multiplex (Kunze) Fr. 1851
- Xylaria myosurus Mont. 1855
- Xylaria nigripes (Klotzsch) Cooke 1883, accepted as Podosordaria nigripes (Klotzsch) P.M.D. Martin, (1976)
- Xylaria oxyacanthae Tul. & C. Tul. 1863,
- Xylaria pistillaris Nitschke*
- Xylaria polymorpha (Pers.) Grev. 1824
- Xylaria reticulata Lloyd 1925
- Xylaria rhopaloides Mont. 1855 (Nom. inval.) accepted as Xylaria rhopaloides Kunze ex Sacc., (1882)
- Xylaria schreuderiana Van der Byl 1932
- Xylaria schweinitzii Berk. & M.A. Curtis 1854
- Xylaria stilboidea Kalchbr. & Cooke 1880
- Xylaria tabacina (J. Kickx f.) Berk. 1851
- Xylaria vaporaria Berk. 1864
- Xylaria variabilis Welw. & Curr. 1868
- Xylaria xanthinovelutina (Mont.) Mont. [as 'ianthino-velutina'], (1856)
- Xylaria sp.

Family: Xylariaceae Tul. & C. Tul. 1863

Genus: Xylosorium Zundel 1939, accepted as Pericladium Pass., (1875)

- Xylosorium piperis Zundel 1939 [as piperii] accepted as Pericladium piperis (Zundel) Mundk. [as 'piperii'], (1944)

== Z ==
Genus: Zukalia Sacc. 1891, accepted as Chaetothyrium Speg., (1888)

- Zukalia parenchymatica Doidge 1920, accepted as Ceramothyrium parenchymaticum (Doidge) Bat., (1962)
- Zukalia transvaalensis Doidge 1917 accepted as Phaeophragmeriella transvaalensis (Doidge) Hansf., (1946)
- Zukalia woodiana Doidge 1920

Genus: Zythia Fr. 1825, accepted as Sarea Fr., (1825)

- Zythia welwitschiae Henn. 1903

Family: Zythiaceae Clem. 1909

== See also ==
- List of bacteria of South Africa
- List of Oomycetes of South Africa
- List of slime moulds of South Africa
