= Nigrospora sphaerica =

Scientific classification
- Kingdom: Fungi
- Division: Ascomycota
- Class: Sordariomycetes
- Order: Trichosphaeriales
- Family: Trichosphaeriaceae
- Genus: Nigrospora
- Species: N. sphaerica

Binomial name
- Nigrospora sphaerica (Sacc.) E.W. Mason (1927)

Synonyms
- Trichosporum sphaericum Sacc. (1882)

Species of fungus

Nigrospora sphaerica is an airborne filamentous fungus in the phylum Ascomycota. It is found in soil, air, and plants as a leaf pathogen. It can occur as an endophyte where it produces antiviral and antifungal secondary metabolites. Sporulation of N. sphaerica causes its initial white coloured colonies to rapidly turn black. N. sphaerica is often confused with the closely related species N. oryzae due to their morphological similarities.

== History ==
The species was first described as Trichosporum sphaericum by Pier Andrea Saccardo in 1882, and was transferred to the genus Nigrospora by E. W. Mason in 1927. In 1913, S. F. Ashby and E. F. Shepherd isolated fungal cultures from banana plants and sugarcane, respectively, which were classified under the genus Nigrospora due to its morphology. Mason studied these cultures and noticed the persistent appearance of two distinct mean spore sizes. The persistence of the division in spore size led to the classification, by Mason, of the larger spore isolates as N. sphaerica, and the smaller isolates as N. oryzae. Since its classification in 1927, it has been under the class Sordariomycetes.

== Growth and morphology ==
Nigrospora sphaerica colonies grow rapidly and appear hairy or woolly. The conidiophores are short and clustered surfacing from mycelium. They appear translucent in colour and have an average range of 8–11 μm in diameter. The conidiophores are often straight stalks or slightly curved. Conidia grow from the tips of the translucent conidiophores. The conidia are brownish black, oblate spheroid, and single celled. On average they range from 16–18 μm in diameter. The initial white translucent looking colony of N. sphaerica turns brown/black due to mass sporulation of conidia from the conidiophores. In laboratories, N. sphaerica is grown on potato dextrose agar (PDA) at room temperature.

== Habitat and ecology ==
Nigrospora sphaerica is commonly found in air, soil, various plants, and some cereal grains. It is rarely found in indoor environments. N. sphaerica has been identified in many areas around the world, however it is most prevalent in tropical and subtropical countries.

A study shows N. sphaerica to be the most abundant airborne fungal species found in various urban sites in Singapore. Air samples were collected using an RCS microbial air sampler. Fungal spores trapped on the agar strips were developed and counted. They were then cultured into isolates allowing for identification by morphology. Results showed N. sphaerica with the highest spore counts at ground levels and low altitudes around 40m.

During asexual reproduction N. sphaerica releases spores known as conidia. The conidia are ejected out forcefully at maximum horizontal distances of 6.7 cm, and 2 cm vertically. Discharge of spores occurs in all directions. The mechanism for projection relies on the conidiophore consisting of a flask-shaped support cell that bears the conidium. Liquid from the support cell squirts through the supporting cell projecting the spore outwards. This characteristic of forcible spore discharge is rarely seen in hyphomycetes. N. sphaerica requires moisture to release spores into the air, therefore accumulation begins around 2:00 a.m. with peak time of abundance occurring around 10:00 a.m. Spore count rapidly decreases after 10:00 a.m. and remains low throughout the day.

== Plant pathogenicity ==
Decaying plants is one of the most common places where N. sphaerica is found. Many studies around the world found N. sphaerica as a leaf pathogen. N. sphaerica was isolated from various plants displaying leaf spots. These reported cases reveal newly identified plant hosts for the pathogen N. sphaerica that have been validated through Koch's postulates. The fungus causes a progressively fatal leaf spot diseases of a range of plants including blueberry (Vaccinium corymbosum), licorice (Glycyrrhiza glabra), and Wisteria sinensis (Chinese Wisteria). Initial lesions resemble small red spots around 2–5 mm particularly near the tips and edges of leaves, eventually resulting in complete defoliation. The fungus also causes a blight disease of the commercial tea plant, Camellia sinensis. Symptoms of blight was observed in commercial tea estates in Darjeeling, India. The disease affected plants of all ages, being especially pronounced in younger plants. Fungal colonies displayed an initial white colour that eventually turned gray/brown. Based on these morphological characteristics, N. sphaerica was identified as the fungal pathogen. Inoculation of the pathogen using conidial suspension spray, and re-isolation of N. sphaerica satisfied Koch's postulates. rRNA sequence comparison of the ITS region confirmed N. sphaerica identity. Cases of leaf spot disease of kiwifruit (Actinidia chinensis var. deliciosa) have been reported from orchards in Huangshan, Anhui Provence, China. Infected leaves browned and defoliated. Conidia morphology and culture properties suggested N. sphaerica as the etiological agent, later confirmed by Koch's postulates and ITS identification.

== Human pathogenicity ==
Often the common response to N. sphaerica in humans is hay fever or asthma. N. sphaerica is not widely considered a true human pathogen; however, there are various reported cases of Nigrospora species in human eye and skin infections. Of those, there have only been a handful of reported cases of N. sphaerica infection in human.

One specific case study identified N. sphaerica as the cause of an onychomycosis case in a 21-year-old man. Onychomycosis is a fungal infection of the nail. Fungal spores found in the body of the nail resembled the characteristic morphology of N. sphaerica. DNA sequence analysis further confirmed the identity.

Another case found N. sphaerica isolated from a corneal ulcer. A woman in south India was diagnosed with a fungal corneal ulcer after being hit in the eye from a cow's tail. Analysis of corneal scrapings showed presence of hyphae elements suggesting cause of ulcer from a fungal pathogen. Isolated cultures were grown and examined. Conidia and colony characteristics of the culture led to identification of N. sphaerica as the fungal pathogen. It was hypothesized that this special case of fungal corneal ulcer was caused by transfer of spores to the patients eye from contamination with soil (a common habitat of the fungus) or other matter from the cow's tail.

== Secondary metabolites ==
Although N. sphaerica is often considered as a pathogen, it can also act as an endophyte depending on its host. Various studies have identified novel metabolites isolated from N. sphaerica. Some of these metabolites act as phytotoxins, while others contain antiviral or antifungal properties. The purpose of the production of many of these metabolites by the fungus are not fully understood or still unknown and is an area that needs to be further studied.

Aphidicolin is a mycotoxin originally known to be produced by the fungus, Cephalosporium aphidicola. This antiviral compound was isolated in mycelium culture filtrate of N. sphaerica.

Epoxyexserophilone is a metabolite similar to the phytotoxin, exserohilone. Fermentation of N. sphaerica led to the production of epoxyexserophilone. Etiolated wheat coleoptile bioassay indicated that the compound is biologically inactive, and ineffective against both gram-positive and gram-negative bacteria.

Nigrosporolide is a 14-membered lactone produced by N. sphaerica. It is structurally related to the phytotoxic metabolite, seiricuprolide, which is produced by the fungus, Seiridium cupressi. The compound is shown to fully inhibit growth of etiolated wheat coleoptiles, at concentrations of 10^{−3}M.

Phomalactone (5,6-dihydro-5-hydroxy-6-prop-2-enyl-2H-pyran-2-one) is found to be produced by N. sphaerica. It inhibits mycelial growth of plant pathogenic fungi, Phytophthora infestans. The metabolite also inhibits sporangium and zoospore germination of both P. infestans and Phytophthora capsici. The study also shows that the metabolite reduces progression of late blight disease in tomatoes caused by P. infestans.
