= C. brassicae =

C. brassicae may refer to:

- Calonectria brassicae, an ascomycete fungus
- Candida brassicae, a pathogenic microbe
- Cercosporella brassicae, a plant pathogen
- Colletotrichum brassicae, a plant pathogen
- Crotonia brassicae, a St. Helena mite
