= Tree mushroom =

Tree mushroom may refer to:

- Volvariella bombycina, or silky volvariella, a species of edible mushrooms in the family Pluteaceae
- Pleurotus, or oyster, a genus of commonly cultivated edible mushrooms in the family Pluteaceae
