= C. volutella =

C. volutella may refer to:

- Calonectria volutella, an ascomycete fungus
- Colletotrichum volutella, a plant pathogen
