= Julius Kühn =

German agronomist (1825–1910)

- Born: October 23, 1825; Pulsnitz
- Died: April 14, 1910 (aged 84); Halle (Saale)
- Education: Agricultural Academy Bonn-Poppelsdorf, Leipzig University
- Occupations: Agronomist, botanist
- Notable work: Die Krankheiten der Kulturgewächse, ihre Ursachen und ihre Verhütung

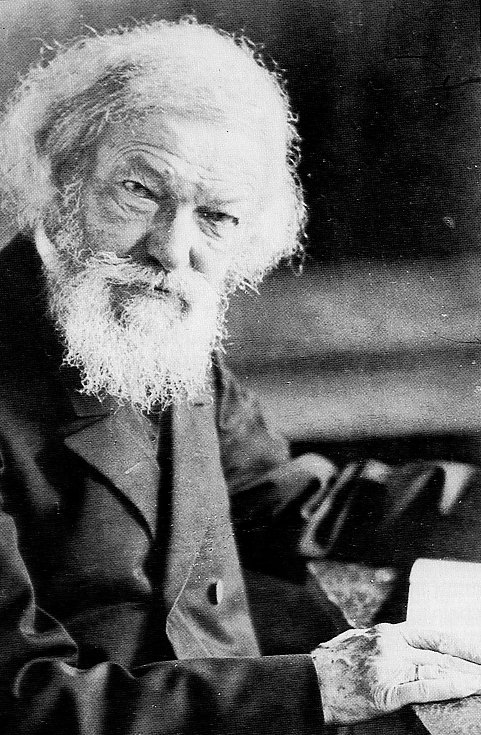
Julius Kühn

Julius Gotthelf Kühn (23 October 1825 – 14 April 1910) was a German academic and agronomist and he was one of the pioneers of plant pathology. Kühn's father was a land owner and he gained experience in agriculture and botany on his father's land. He was trained in Bonn, starting at age 30 and was awarded his doctorate, which focused on diseases of beet and canola at Leipzig. In 1862, he became a professor of agriculture at the University of Halle. Kuhn published more than 70 papers on mycology and plant pathology over the course of his career.

Kühn collected and characterized precisely smut fungi with material distributed in famous exsiccatae edited by Felix von Thümen, Gottlob Ludwig Rabenhorst and Heinrich Georg Winter. An example is the exsiccata item no.2099: Ustilago rabenhorstiana in the series Rabenhorst, Fungi Europaei exsiccati.

One of his seminar papers was the 1858 publication "Die Krankheiten der Kulturgewächse".

He was honoured in 1898, when botanist Paul Wilhelm Magnus circumscribed Kuehneola, which is a genus of rust fungi in the family Phragmidiaceae.
