= Aphidicolin =

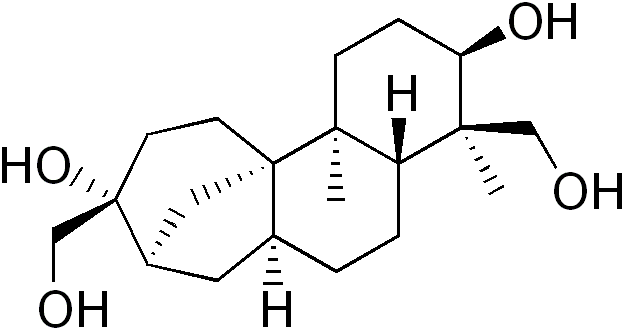

Names
- IUPAC name (3R,4R,4aR,6aS,8R,9R,11aS,11bS)-4,9-bis(hydroxymethyl)-4,11b-dimethyltetradecahydro-8,11a-methanocyclohepta[a]naphthalene-3,9-diol

Identifiers
| CAS Number | 38966-21-1 |
| 3D model (JSmol) | Interactive image |
| ChEBI | CHEBI:2766 |
| ChEMBL | ChEMBL29711 |
| ChemSpider | 10280269 |
| ECHA InfoCard | 100.109.656 |
| PubChem CID | 457964 |
| UNII | 192TJ6PP19 |
| CompTox Dashboard (EPA) | DTXSID5036711 |
- InChI: InChI=1S/C20H34O4/c1-17(11-21)15-4-3-13-9-14-10-19(13,7-8-20(14,24)12-22)18(15,2)6-5-16(17)23/h13-16,21-24H,3-12H2,1-2H3/t13-,14+,15-,16+,17-,18-,19-,20-/m0/s1 Key: NOFOAYPPHIUXJR-APNQCZIXSA-N; InChI=1/C20H34O4/c1-17(11-21)15-4-3-13-9-14-10-19(13,7-8-20(14,24)12-22)18(15,2)6-5-16(17)23/h13-16,21-24H,3-12H2,1-2H3/t13-,14+,15-,16+,17-,18-,19-,20-/m0/s1 Key: NOFOAYPPHIUXJR-APNQCZIXBU
- SMILES: OC[C@@]4(O)CC[C@]31C[C@H]4C[C@@H]3CC[C@H]2[C@](C)(CO)[C@H](O)CC[C@]12C

Properties
| Chemical formula | C_{20}H_{34}O_{4} |
| Molar mass | 338.48 g/mol |
- Except where otherwise noted, data are given for materials in their standard state (at 25 °C [77 °F], 100 kPa). verify (what is ?) Infobox references

Aphidicolin is a tetracyclic diterpene antibiotic first isolated from the fungus Lecanicillium muscarium (formerly Cephalosporium aphidicola) with antiviral and antimitotic properties. Aphidicolin is a reversible inhibitor of eukaryotic nuclear DNA replication. It blocks the cell cycle at early S phase. It is a specific inhibitor of DNA polymerase Alpha and Delta in eukaryotic cells and in some viruses (vaccinia and herpesviruses) and an apoptosis inducer in HeLa cells. Natural aphidicolin is also a secondary metabolite of the fungus Nigrospora oryzae.

== Bibliography ==
- Dhillon VS, Husain SA, Ray GN (2003). "Expression of aphidicolin-induced fragile sites and their relationship between genetic susceptibility in breast cancer, ovarian cancer, and non-small-cell lung cancer patients". Teratogenesis, Carcinogenesis, and Mutagenesis. Suppl 1: 35–45. doi:10.1002/tcm.10068. PMID 12616595.
- Mahy BW (2001). A dictionary of virology (3rd ed.). San Diego, Calif. [u.a.]: Academic Press. pp. 19. ISBN 978-0-12-465327-6.
