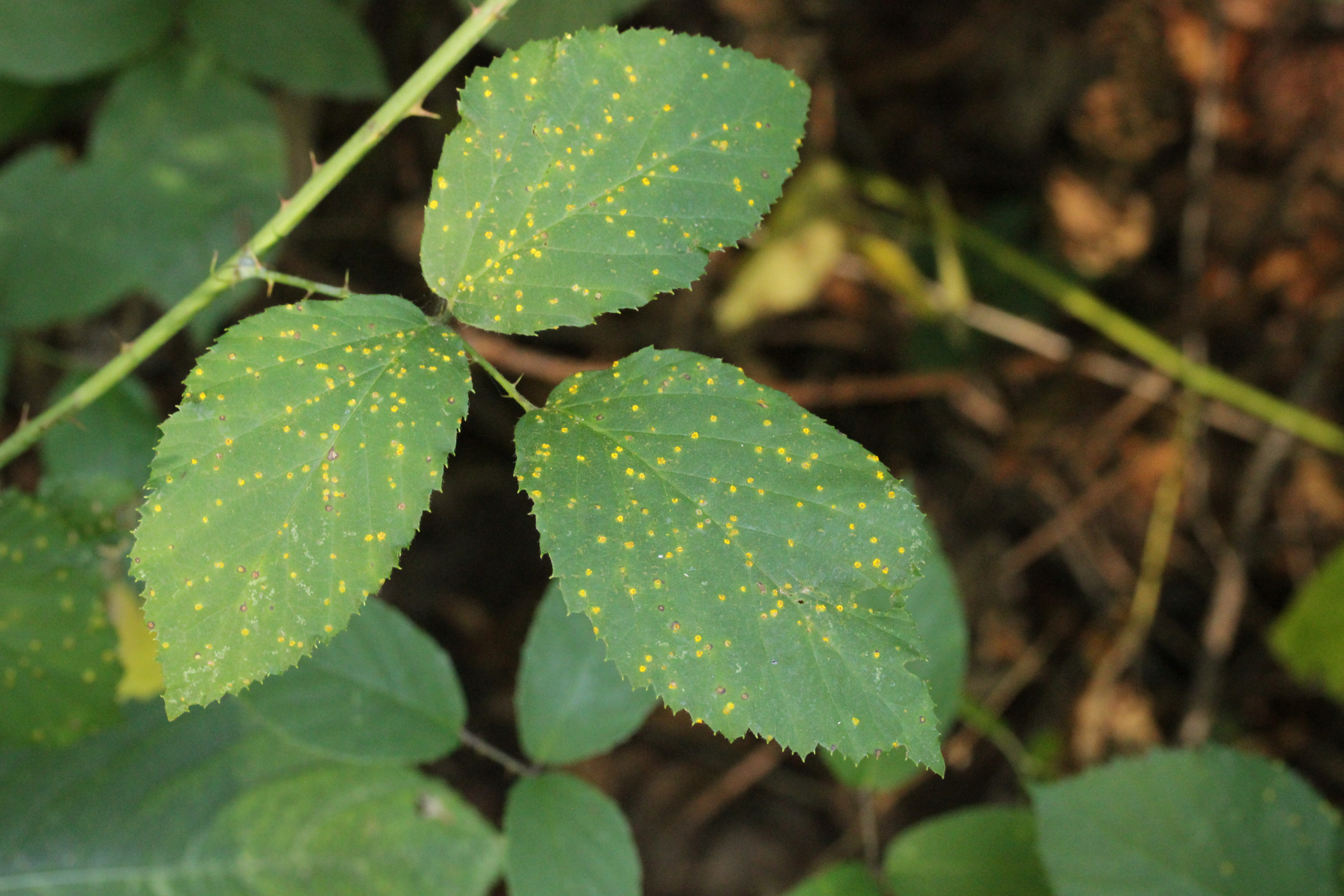

Scientific classification
- Kingdom: Fungi
- Division: Basidiomycota
- Class: Pucciniomycetes
- Order: Pucciniales
- Family: Phragmidiaceae
- Genus: Kuehneola
- Species: K. uredinis

Binomial name
- Kuehneola uredinis (Link) Arthur (1906)

Synonyms
- Uredo uredinis Link (1824); Chrysomyxa albida Kuehneola albida Oidium uredinis Phragmidium albidum Torula uredinis Uredo muelleri

= Kuehneola uredinis =

Species of fungus

Kuehneola uredinis is a plant pathogen. Kuehneola uredinis is a fungal pathogen that causes cane and leaf rust only in Rubus cultivars or wild and ornamental blackberry species.
