= Valsaria =

Scientific classification
- Kingdom: Fungi
- Division: Ascomycota
- Class: Dothideomycetes
- incertae sedis
- Genus: Valsaria; Ces. & De Not.

Type species
- Valsaria insitiva (Tode) Ces. & De Not.

Genus of fungi

Valsaria is a genus of fungi in the class Dothideomycetes. The relationship of this taxon to other taxa within the class is unknown (incertae sedis).

== See also ==
- List of Dothideomycetes genera incertae sedis
