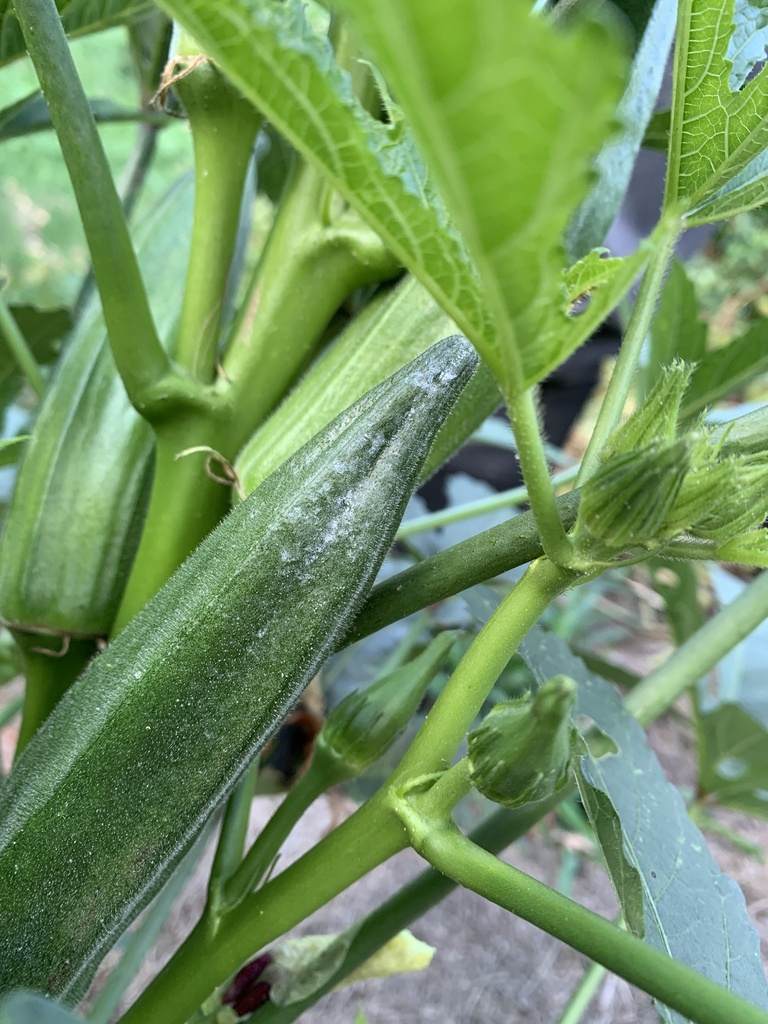

Scientific classification
- Kingdom: Fungi
- Division: Ascomycota
- Class: Leotiomycetes
- Order: Helotiales
- Family: Erysiphaceae
- Genus: Podosphaera
- Species: F. abelmoschi

Binomial name
- Fibroidium abelmoschi (Thüm.) U. Braun & R.T.A. Cook, 2012

Synonyms
- Oidium abelmoschi Thüm., 1878; Euoidium abelmoschi (Thüm.) Y.S. Paul & J.N. Kapoor, 1987; Acrosporium abelmoschi (Thüm.) Subram., 1971

= Fibroidium abelmoschi =

Species of fungus

Fibroidium abelmoschi is a species of powdery mildew in the family Erysiphaceae. It is found across the world, wherever its host plant (Abelmoschus) is found.

== Description ==
The fungus forms thin, white irregular patches on the leaves of its host. Fibroidium abelmoschi, like most Erysiphaceae, is highly host-specific and infects only one genus. Abelmoschus may also play host to a Golovinomyces species.

== Taxonomy ==
The fungus was formally described in 1878 by Thümen with the basionym Oidium abelmoschi. The species was transferred to the genus Fibroidium by Braun and Cook in 2012. With the implementation of the 'one fungus, one name' change to the Code, the species was transferred to the genus Podosphaera although no new combination has been created. The specific epithet derives from the host genus, Abelmoschus.
