= Geotrichum citri-aurantii =

Scientific classification
- Kingdom: Fungi
- Division: Ascomycota
- Class: Dipodascomycetes
- Order: Dipodascales
- Family: Dipodascaceae
- Genus: Geotrichum
- Species: G. citri-aurantii

Binomial name
- Geotrichum citri-aurantii (Ferraris) E.E. Butler

Fungal plant pathogen

Geotrichum citri-aurantii is a plant pathogen. It is a common post harvest fungus disease of citrus known as "sour rot".
