= Polyscytalum pustulans =

Scientific classification
- Kingdom: Fungi
- Division: Ascomycota
- Class: Ascomycetes
- Order: incertae sedis
- Family: incertae sedis
- Genus: Polyscytalum
- Species: P. pustulans

Binomial name
- Polyscytalum pustulans (M.N. Owen & Wakef.) M.B. Ellis (1976)

Synonyms
- Oospora pustulans

Species of fungus

Polyscytalum pustulans is an ascomycete fungus that is a plant pathogen causing skin spot of potatoes.
