= Kuehneola =

Scientific classification
- Domain: Eukaryota
- Kingdom: Fungi
- Division: Basidiomycota
- Class: Pucciniomycetes
- Order: Pucciniales
- Family: Phragmidiaceae
- Genus: Kuehneola; Magnus (1898)

Type species
- Kuehneola albida (J.G.Kühn) Magnus (1898)

Species
- K. dryadis K. flacourtiae K. harrisoniae K. japonica K. loeseneriana K. papuana K. ramacharii K. spondiadis K. uredinis K. ziziphi

Genus of fungi

Kuehneola is a genus of rust fungi in the family Phragmidiaceae. The widespread genus contains nine species.

The genus name of Kuehneola is in honour of Julius Gotthelf Kühn (1825–1910), who was a German academic and agronomist and he was one of the founders of Plant Pathology.

The genus was circumscribed by Paul Wilhelm Magnus in Bot. Centralbl. vol.74 on page 169 in 1898.
