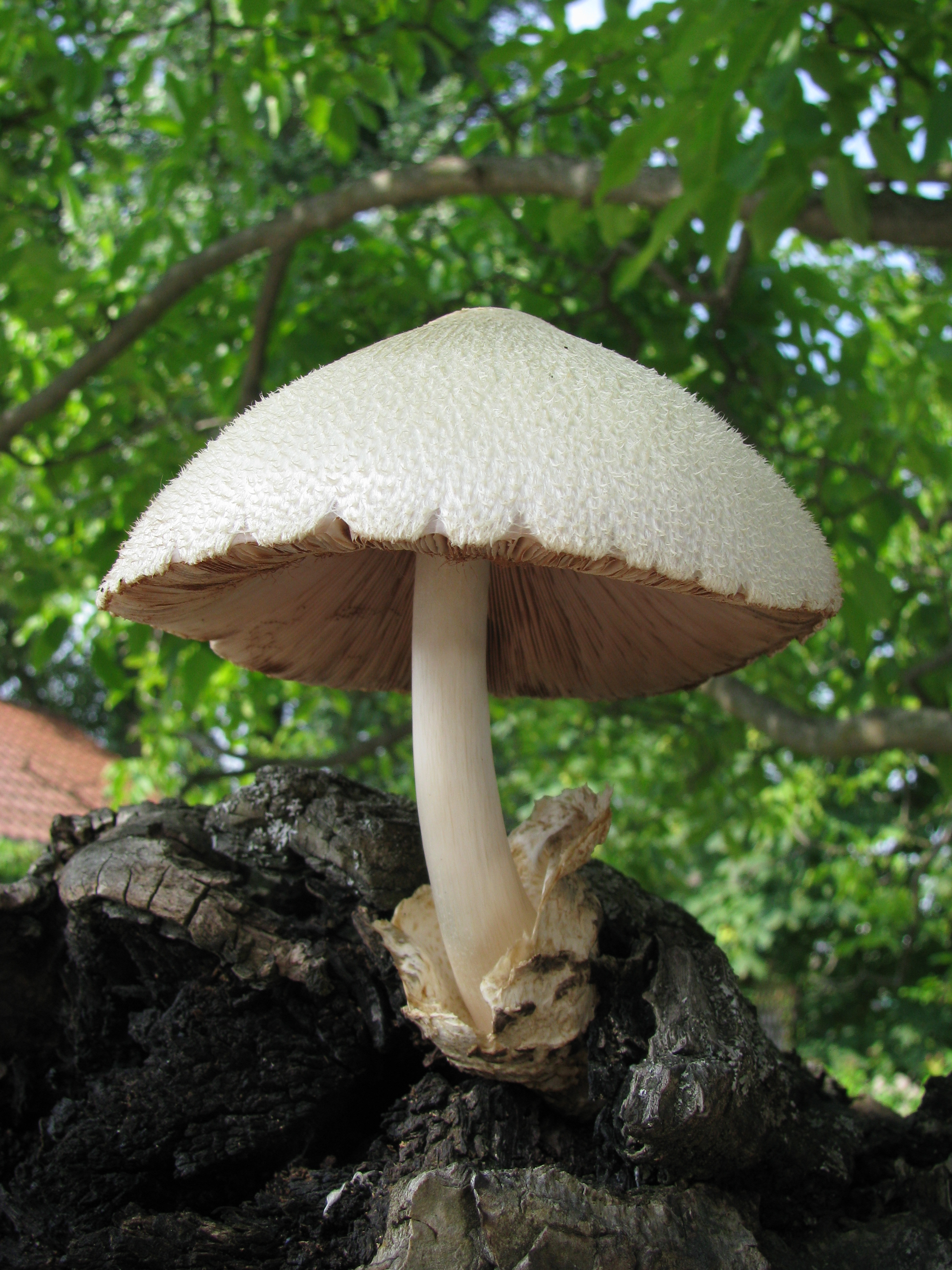

Scientific classification
- Kingdom: Fungi
- Division: Basidiomycota
- Class: Agaricomycetes
- Order: Agaricales
- Family: Pluteaceae
- Genus: Volvariella
- Species: V. bombycina

Binomial name
- Volvariella bombycina (Schaeff.) Singer (1951)

Synonyms
- Agaricus bombycinus Schaeff. (1774); Agaricus denudatus Batsch (1783); Amanita calyptrata Lam. (1783); Pluteus bombycinus (Schaeff.) Fr. (1836); Volvaria bombycina (Schaeff.) P.Kumm. (1871); Volvariopsis bombycina (Schaeff.) Murrill (1911)

= Volvariella bombycina =

Species of mushroom in the family Pluteaceae

Volvariella bombycina
- Mycological characteristics
- Gills on hymenium
- Cap is conical or umbonate
- Hymenium is free
- Stipe has a volva
- Spore print is pink to salmon
- Ecology is saprotrophic
- Edibility is edible or choice

Volvariella bombycina, commonly known as the silky volvariella, tree silksheath, silky sheath, silky rosegill, silver-silk straw mushroom, or tree mushroom, is a species of fungus in the family Pluteaceae.

The fruit body (mushroom) begins developing in a thin, egg-like sac. This ruptures and the stem expands quickly, leaving the sac at the base of the stem as a volva. The cap, which can attain a diameter of up to 20 centimetres (8 inches), is white to slightly yellowish and covered with silky hairs. On the underside of the cap are closely spaced gills, free from attachment to the stem, and initially white before turning pink as the spores mature.

It is an uncommon but widespread species, having been reported from Eurasia, the Americas, and Australia. The mushroom grows singly or in clusters, often appearing in old knotholes and wounds in elms and maples. It is edible and contains compounds with antibacterial properties.

== Taxonomy ==
The species was first described in 1774 by German naturalist Jacob Christian Schäffer as Agaricus bombycinus. Throughout its taxonomical history, it has been shuffled to several genera, including Pluteus (by Elias Fries in 1836), Volvaria (Paul Kummer, 1871), and Volvariopsis (William Alphonso Murrill, 1911). Rolf Singer placed it in its current genus, Volvariella, in 1951. Other names that have been applied to the species include Jean-Baptiste Lamarck's Amanita calyptrata and August Johann Georg Karl Batsch's Agaricus denudatus (both published in 1783), but these are illegitimate names as Schäffer's earlier 1774 name has priority.

In 1949, Murrill described the variety flaviceps from collections made growing on magnolia wood in Gainesville, Florida. Although he originally described it as a new species, Volvaria flaviceps, Robert Shaffer considered it a variety of V. bombycina. Variety microspora was first described in 1953, was later (1961) named by Richard William George Dennis; variety palmicola was originally described as a distinct species Volvaria palmicola by Belgian mycologist Maurice Beely in 1928, and later as a variety of V. bombycina by the same author in 1937.

The root for the generic name Volvariella (as well as Volvaria and Volvariopsis, genera in which the species had been formerly placed) derives from the Latin volva, meaning "wrapper" or "a covering". The specific epithet bombycina derives from the Latin root bombyc, or "silky". Common names for the mushroom include the "silky sheath", the "silky rosegill", the "silver-silk straw mushroom", or the "tree mushroom".

== Description ==
The fruit bodies are initially enclosed by a universal veil. The caps are initially oval, becoming bell-shaped to convex, and sometimes nearly flat in old age; they measure 5–20 centimetres (2–8 inches) wide. The cap is white to yellowish, more pale at the margin, dry and covered with silky threads. The flesh is thin, soft, and white, and has an odor resembling raw potatoes. The gills are crowded close together, free from attachment to the stem, and initially white before turning pinkish as the spores mature. The stem is 6–20 cm (2 1/2–8 in) long and 1–3 cm (1/2–1 1/4 in) thick, typically tapered upward or thickened below. It is white, smooth, and often slightly curved. The universal veil is membranous, often areolate (cracked into irregularly shaped blocks) or scaly, and forms a long, saclike volva that wraps around the base of the stem. It is white to yellowish or dingy brown, and often divided into lobes.

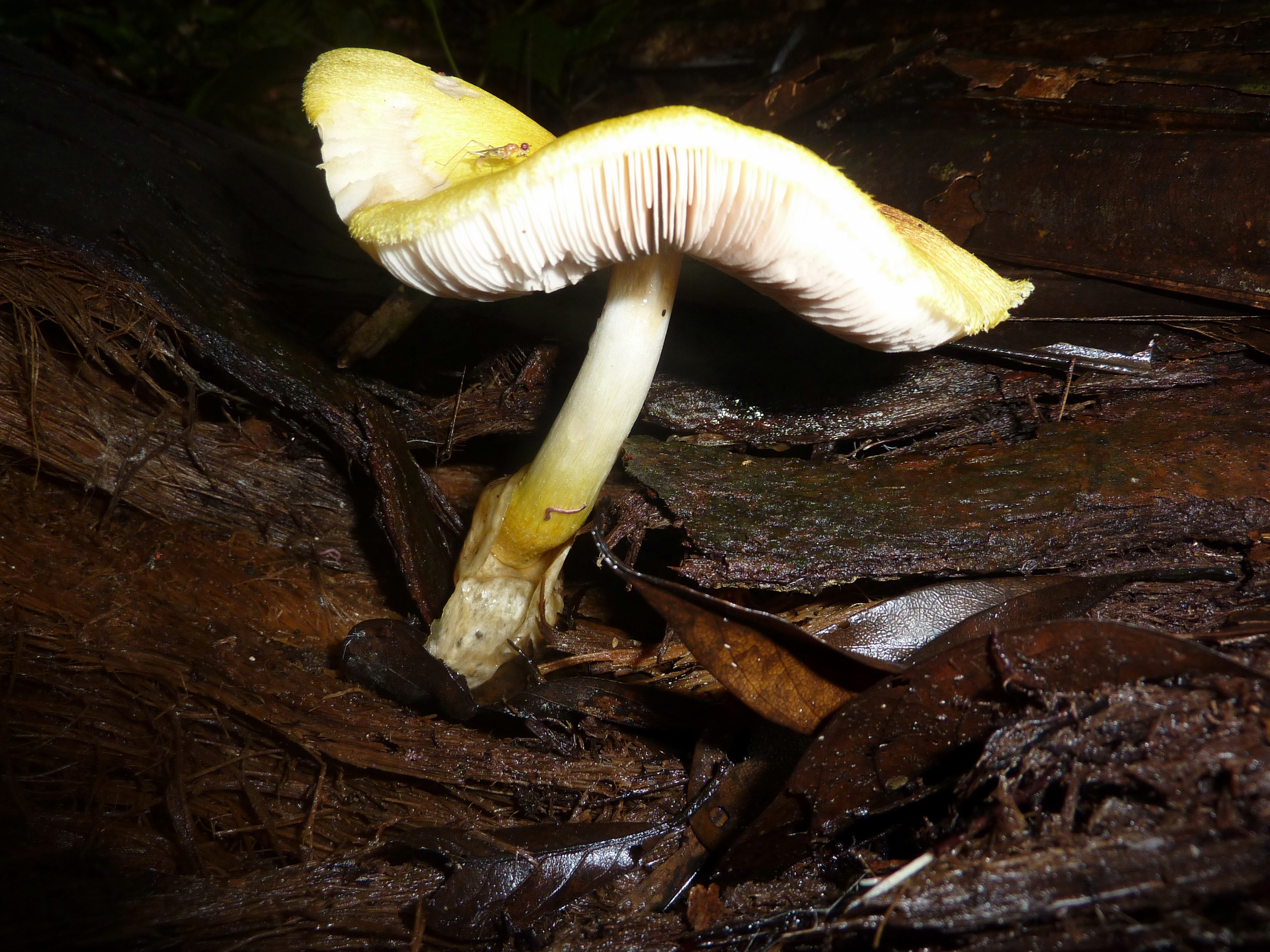
The variety flaviceps has a yellow cap.

The variety V. bombycina var. flaviceps is distinguished from the main form by its smaller, bright yellow caps, up to 3.5 cm (1 1/2 in) in diameter, and its dirty-white, scaly volva. Murrill also noted that it developed a "peculiar sickening odor during drying". V. bombycina var. microspora has smaller spores (6–7.5 by 4–5 μm), a yellow cap, and a blotched brown volva. V. bombycina var. palmicola also has a yellow cap and small spores (5.9–7.5 by 4.3–5.4 μm), but can be distinguished from the previous varieties by its distantly spaced gills.

Mushrooms produce a spore print with a color ranging from pinkish to salmon. The spores are elliptical, smooth, and measure 6.5–10 by 4.5–6.5 μm. The basidia (spore-bearing cells) are club-shaped, four-spored, and measure 19–43 by 6–11 μm. Pleurocystidia (cystidia that occur on the gill face) are usually spindle shaped, but have a widely variable morphology; they are abundant in the hymenium, and have dimensions of 26–122 by 8–57 μm. The cheilocystidia (on the gill edge) are similar in morphology and abundance, some may feature knobs held at the end of slender projections up to 20 μm long; dimensions are in the range of 26 and 144 μm long by 8–46 μm wide. Clamp connections are absent from the hyphae of V. bombycina.

The fruit bodies can be readily grown in laboratory culture.

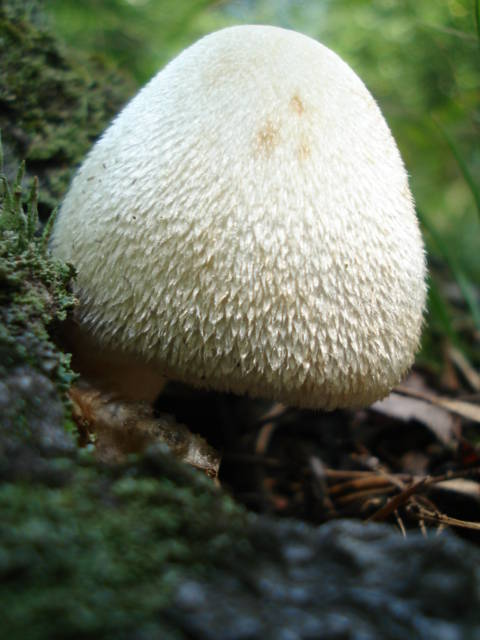
Cap close-up

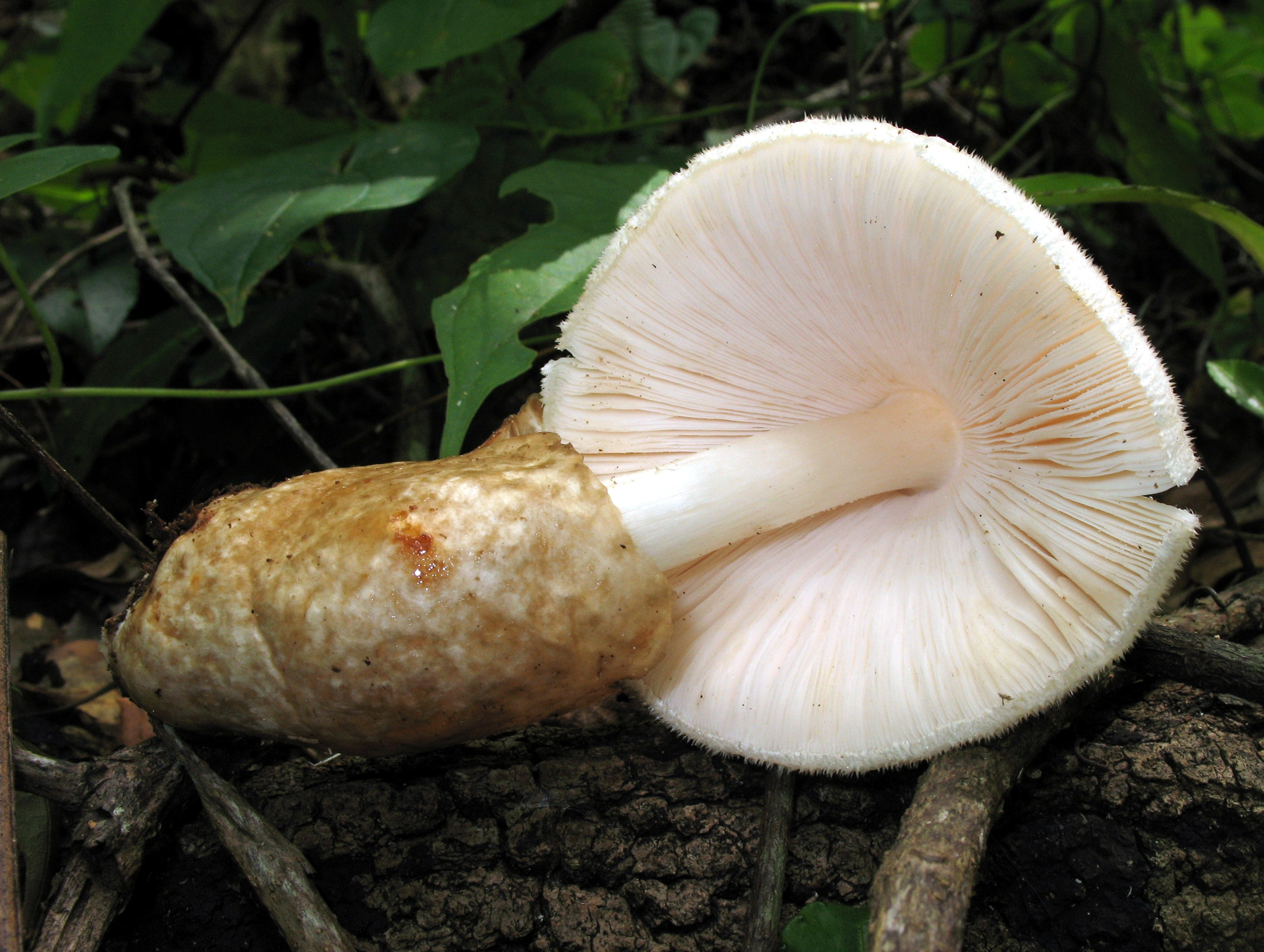
A tannish sac-like volva covers the stem base.

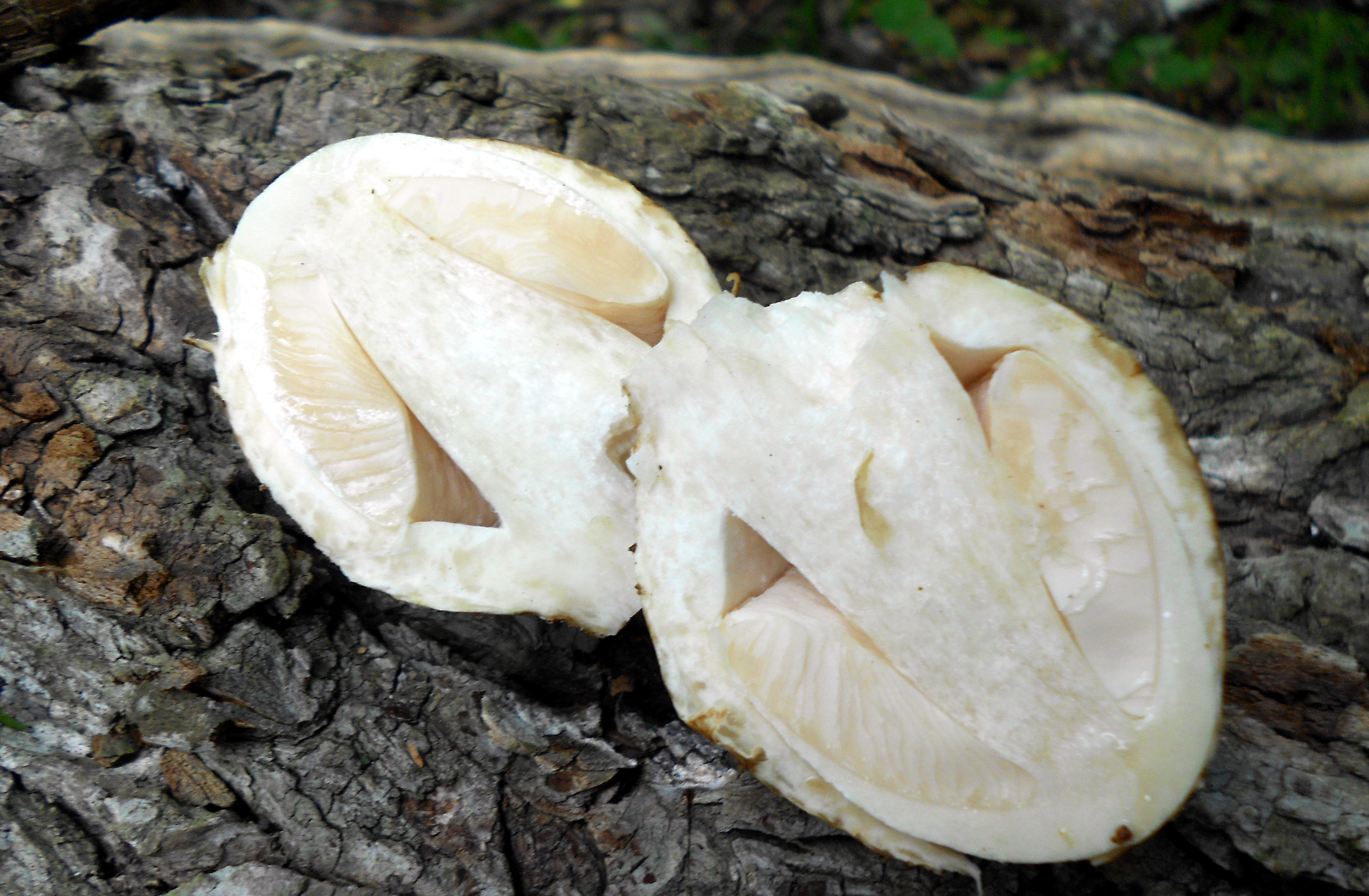
A bisected young fruit body, still enveloped by the universal veil

=== Bioactive compounds ===
Several bioactive secondary metabolites have been isolated and identified from V. bombycina fruit bodies, mycelium, or pure culture. The compounds ergosta-4,6,8(14),22-tetraene-3-one, ergosterol peroxide, indole-3-carboxaldehyde, and indazole were found in liquid culture. In 2009, the novel compound isodeoxyhelicobasidin was identified from culture broth; this compound inhibits the enzyme human elastase. The fungus also produces compounds that have antioxidative activity.

=== Similar species ===
The combination of a silky white cap, white stem, pink gills, pink spore print, and growth on wood is characteristic of this species and make identification of V. bombycina in the field relatively easy. Some Pluteus species have a general similar appearance, and also produce pinkish to pinkish-brown spore prints, but they lack a volva. Amanita species grow on the ground and make white spore prints. V. pusilla has a small cap measuring 0.5–3 cm (1/4–1 1/4 in) in diameter with silky fibers and short lines visible at the cap edge when moist; it grows in soil in gardens and greenhouses and on lawns. V. hypopithys has a medium-size white cap that is 2–5 cm (3/4–2 in) in diameter with silky to scaly fibers and lacks the short lines at the cap edge when moist; it grows on the ground in woods. V. caesiotincta has a bluish-gray cap, while V. gloiocephala can be distinguished from V. bombycina by its smooth cap that is sticky when damp, and a white volva.

== Habitat and distribution ==
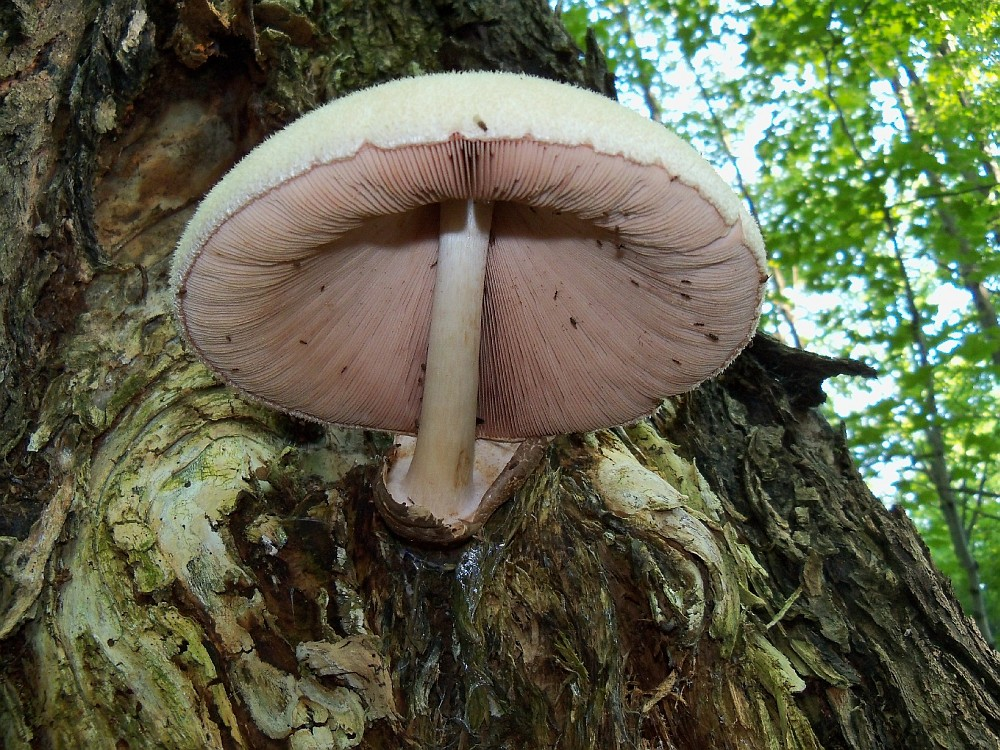
Fruit bodies often grow in knotholes or clefts of trees; shown here on sugar maple.

Volvariella bombycina is a saprobic species. Fruit bodies grow singly or in small groups on trunks and decayed stumps of dead hardwoods. Favored species include sugar maple, red maple, silver maple, magnolia, mango, beech, oak, and elm. It is often found in clefts and knotholes of dead or living tree trunks. It has been noted to fruit in the same location for several years. Despite its preference for hardwoods, it has been reported growing on rare instances on coniferous wood.

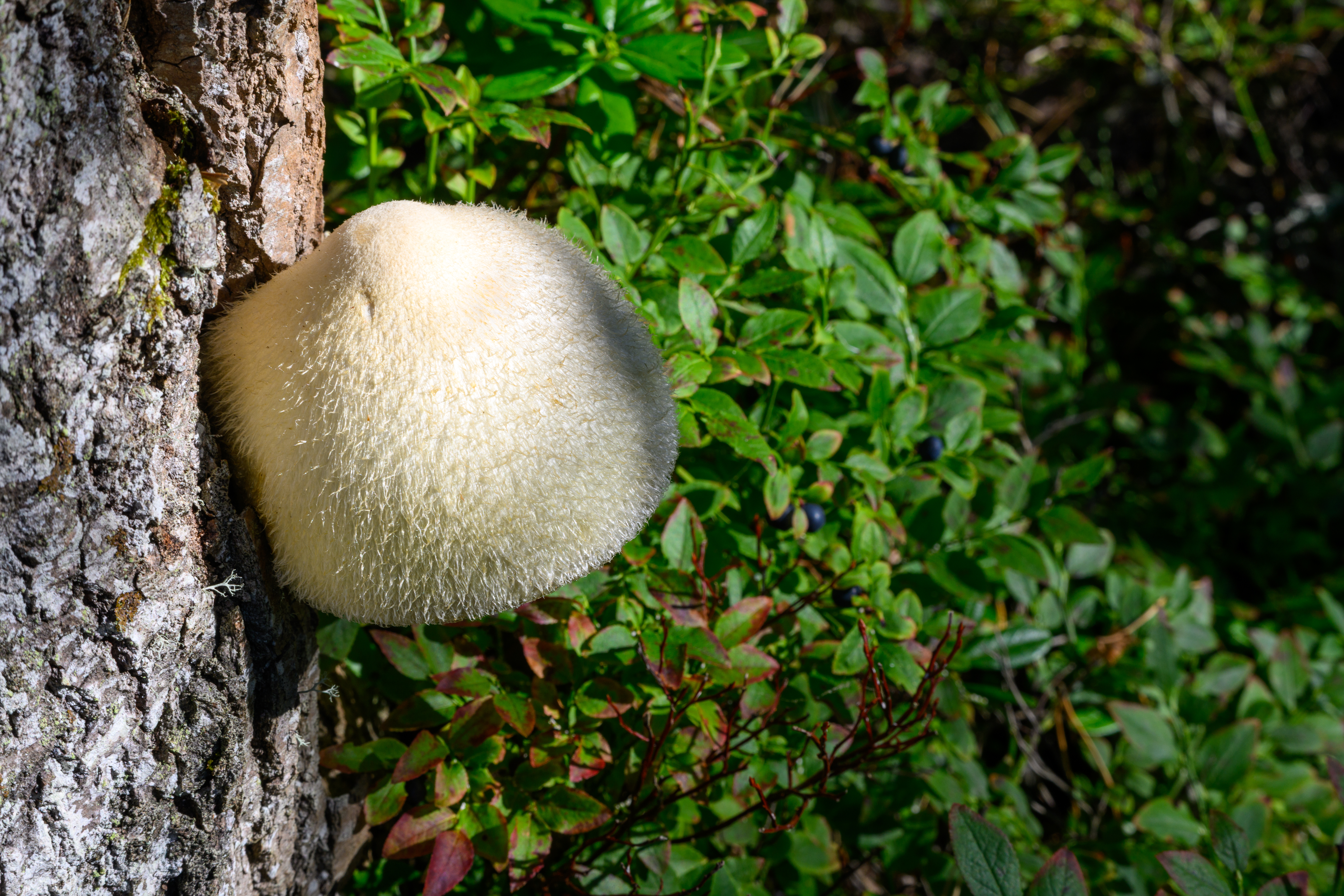
Silky rosegill growing from a birch tree wound on Kållandsö, Sweden

An uncommon species with a wide distribution, it has been reported from Europe, Asia (Iran, China, India, Korea, and Pakistan), North and South America, the Caribbean (Cuba), and Australia. It acquired protected status in Hungary in 2005, making it a legal offense to pick it. Variety microspora is known from Venezuela, while V. bombycina var. palmicola occurs in the Democratic Republic of the Congo.

== Uses ==
The fruit bodies are edible, and usually considered of good quality. They have been called "excellent", "tasty" with a "modest and pleasant flavor", and "worth eating if found in large enough quantities".

== In culture ==
Alexander H. Smith related a story of how unique circumstances led to the development of a local superstition about the species:

... the members of a family here in Ann Arbor were poisoned, some fatally, as the result of eating caps of a species of Amanita. The next year Volvaria bombycina fruited on a maple tree at the home of these people, and the story was circulated that some of the spores of the poisonous fungus, which caused the deaths the year before, had escaped from the house, lodged in the tree, germinated, grew and were now producing fruiting bodies. Consequently the carpophores of the Volvaria were held in great awe by the neighbors, and soon came to be referred to as the "ghost mushroom". No one, of course, would consider eating them.

== Gallery ==
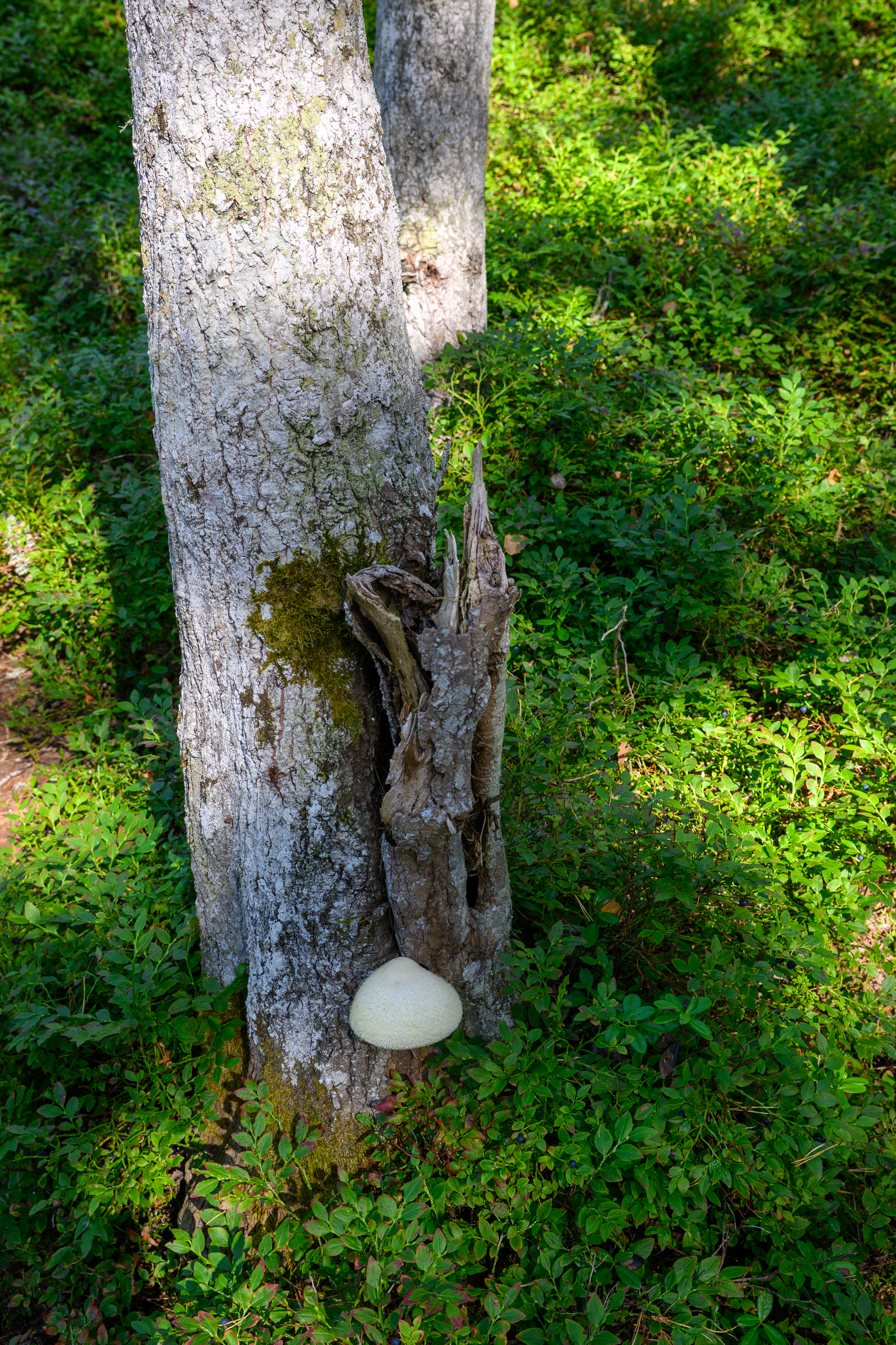
Fruiting from a birch tree cavity in Kållandsö, Sweden

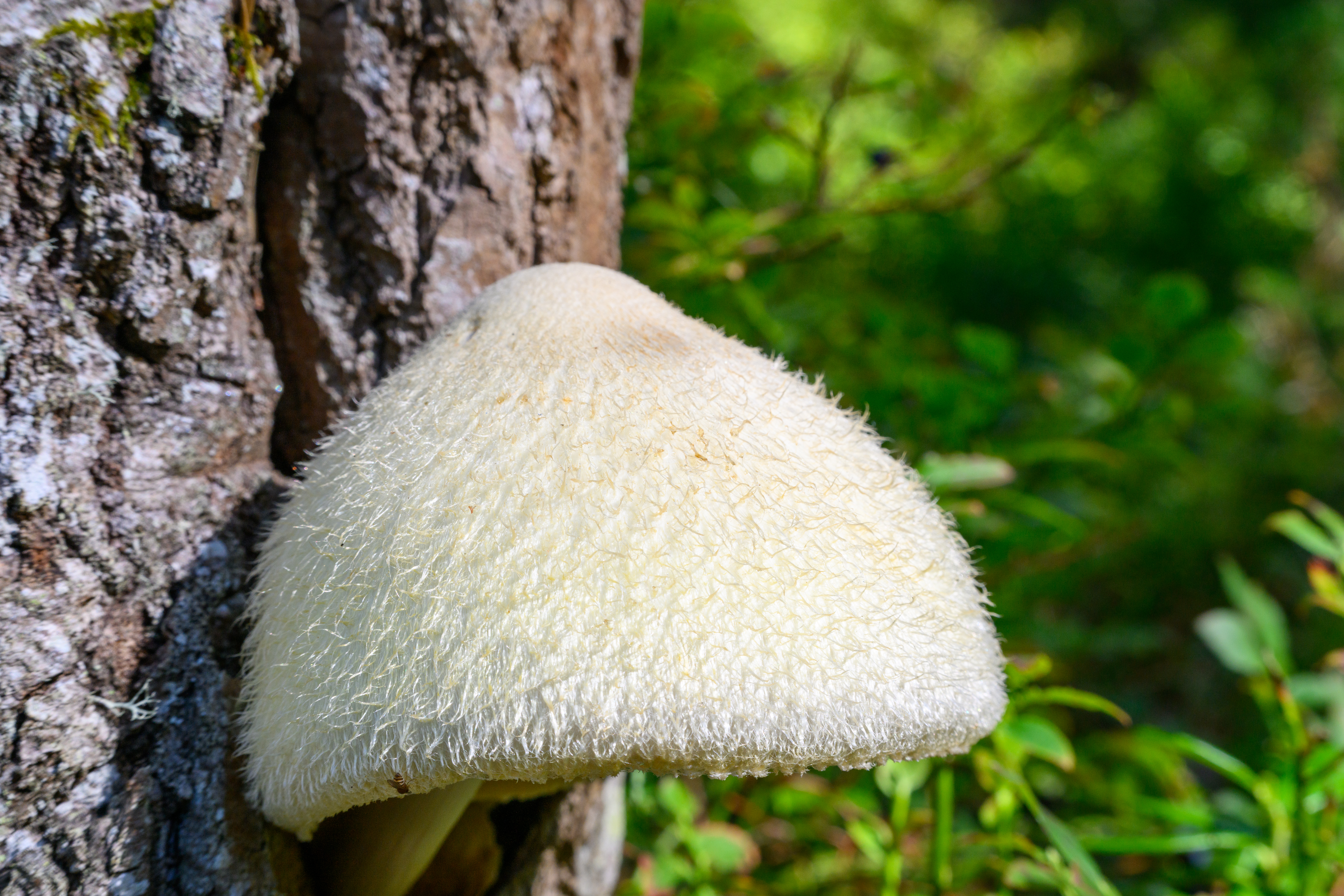
Cap showing characteristic silky, fibrillose texture

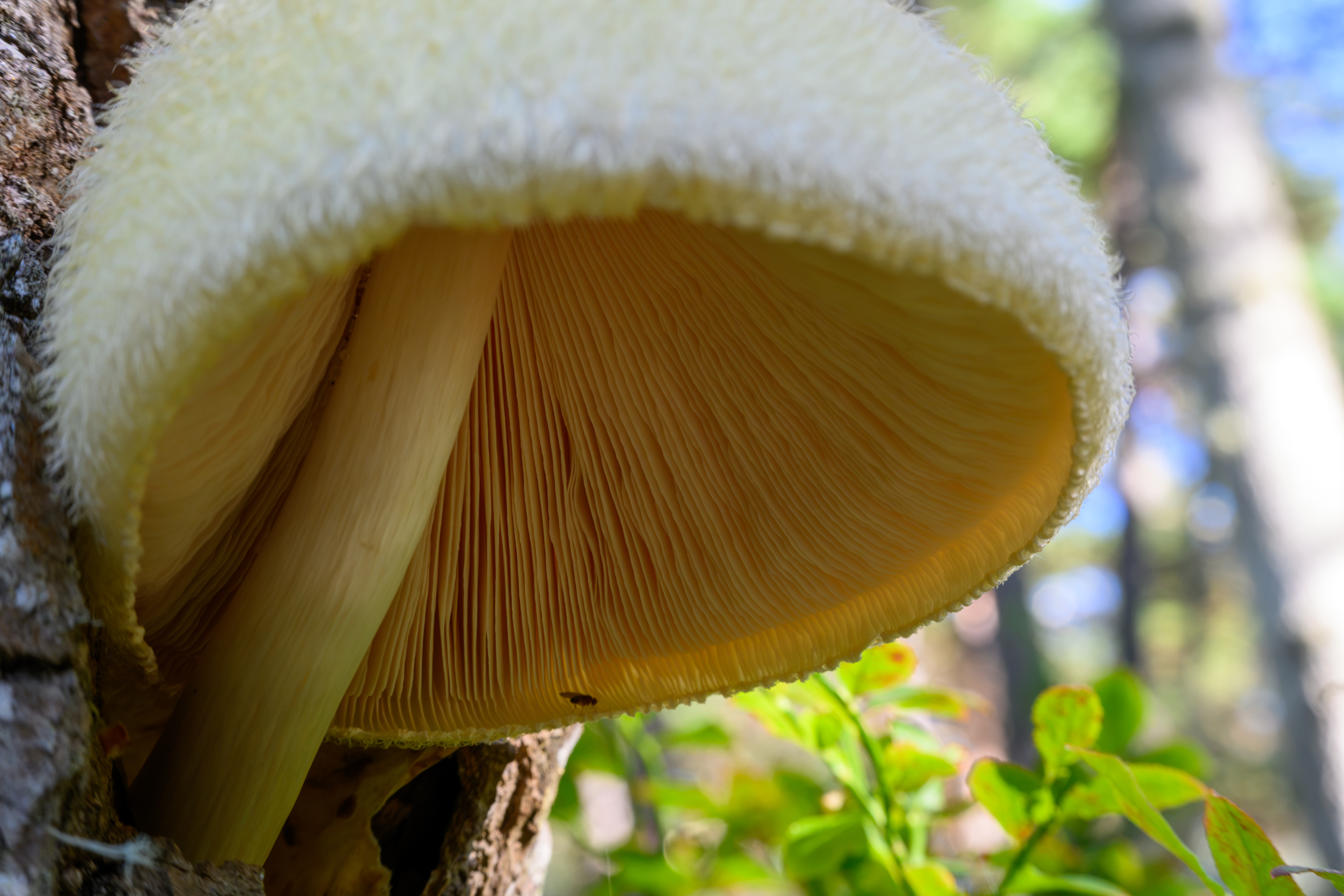
Underside displaying crowded, free gills
