= Deshpandiella =

Scientific classification
- Kingdom: Fungi
- Division: Ascomycota
- Class: Sordariomycetes
- Order: Phyllachorales
- Family: Phyllachoraceae
- Genus: Deshpandiella; Kamat & Ullasa

Type species
- Deshpandiella jambolana (T.S. Ramakr., Sriniv. & Sundaram) Kamat & Ullasa

Genus of fungi

Deshpandiella is a genus of fungi in the family Phyllachoraceae. This is a monotypic genus, containing the single species Deshpandiella jambolana.
