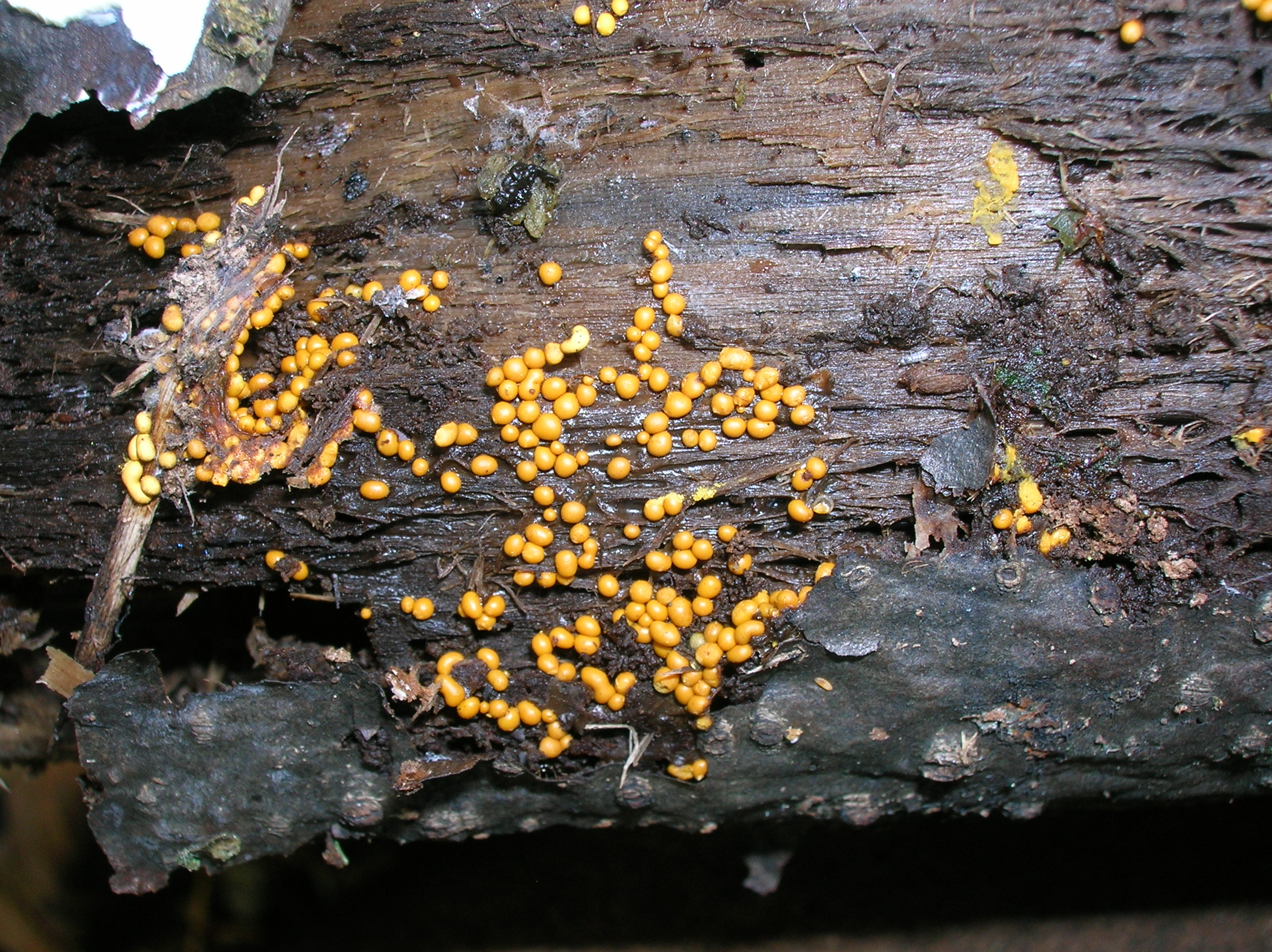
- The fungus Nectria peziza growing on rotting wood

Scientific classification
- Kingdom: Fungi
- Division: Ascomycota
- Class: Sordariomycetes
- Order: Hypocreales
- Family: Nectriaceae
- Genus: Nectria
- Species: N. peziza

Binomial name
- Nectria peziza (Tode) Fr., (1849)

Synonyms
- Lycoperdon hydrophorum Peziza hydrophora Bulliard t.

= Nectria peziza =

Species of fungus

Nectria peziza or yellow spot is an ascomycete fungus with bright yellow to orange globose fruiting bodies (0.2 – 0.4 mm across) found on rotting polypores, well rotted deadwood, bark, dung, and decaying cloth. Its globular fruiting bodies (peritheca), quite large for the genus, may be isolated or crowded; they have a slightly prominent black dot at the top, the ostiolum, this being the entrance to the inner cavity; the bodies often collapse into a cup-shape when dry and the colour fades to pale yellow or whitish.

== Synonyms ==
This fungus has an unusually large number of previous binomials, such as – Sphaeria peziza (1791); Hydropisphaera peziza (1822); Dialonectria peziza (1884); Cucurbitaria peziza (1898); Neuronectria peziza (1957); Byssonectria bryophila (1985); Sphaeria aurea (1823); Nectria aurea (1879); Dialonectria aurea (1884); Cucurbitaria aurea (1898); Byssonectria epigaea; and Nectria epigaea (1879).

== Classification ==
Nectra peziza belongs to the order Hypocreales within the class Sordariomycetes, usually recognized by their brightly coloured (usually red, orange or yellow), perithecial ascomata, or spore-producing structures.

== Distribution ==
Nectria peziza has been recorded from Africa (Seychelles); Asia (Japan, Pakistan); Caribbean Islands (Bermuda); Europe (Denmark, Germany); North America (USA, Canada); and New Zealand. It is recorded as growing on a wide range of tree species. In the British Isles it has a wide range of distribution and has been found in England, Northern Ireland, Wales and Scotland. N. peziza has even been found in Antarctica, growing in the Windmill Island group.

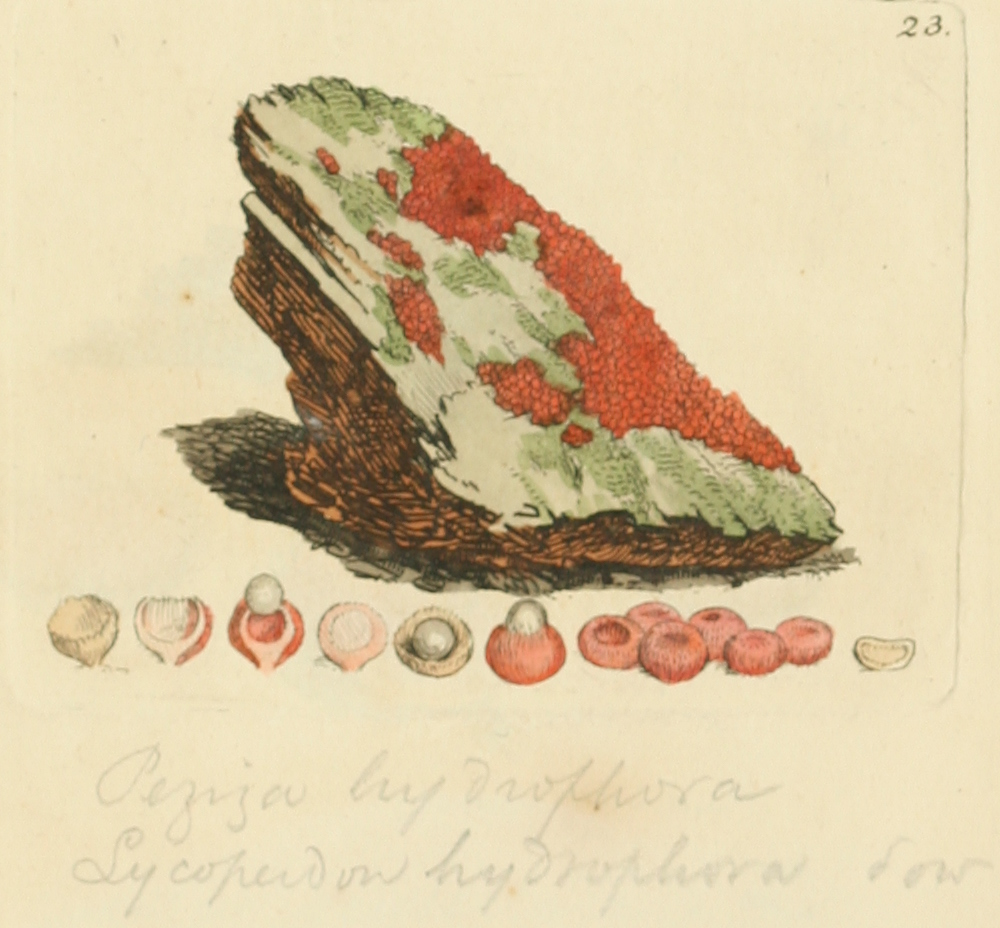
A painting of N. peziza from 1797.

== See also ==
- Nectria cinnabarina - a closely related and more common species.
