= Ovulariopsis papayae =

Scientific classification
- Kingdom: Fungi
- Division: Ascomycota
- Class: Leotiomycetes
- Order: Helotiales
- Family: Erysiphaceae
- Genus: Phyllactinia
- Species: P. papayae

Binomial name
- Phyllactinia papayae Van der Byl, (1921)

Species of fungus

Ovulariopsis papayae is a plant pathogen affecting papayas.

== See also ==
- List of papaya diseases
