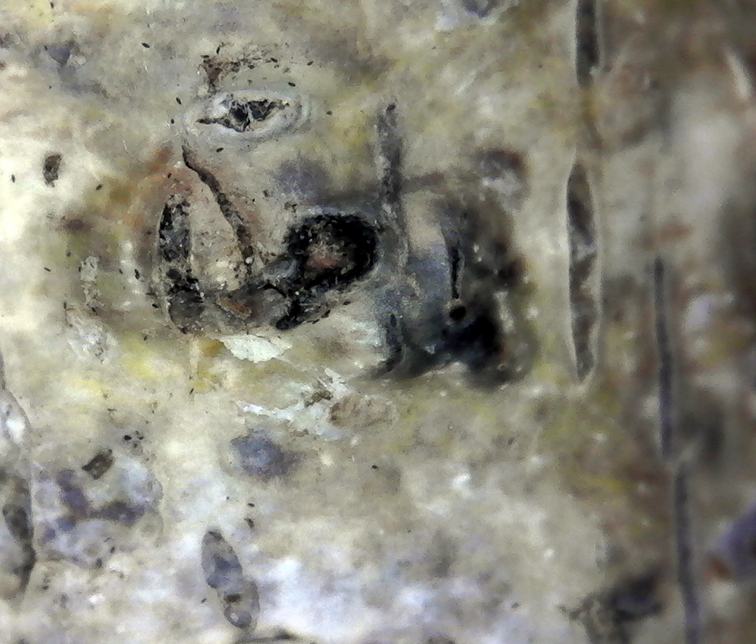

Scientific classification
- Domain: Eukaryota
- Kingdom: Fungi
- Division: Ascomycota
- Class: Eurotiomycetes
- Order: Pyrenulales
- Family: Pyrenulaceae
- Genus: Pyrenula
- Species: P. pyrenuloides

Binomial name
- Pyrenula pyrenuloides (Mont.) R.C.Harris, 1989

Synonyms
- Synonymy: Anthracothecium pyrenuloides (Mont.) Müll. Arg.; Bathelium pyrenuloides (Mont.) Trevis.; Bottaria pyrenuloides (Mont.) Trevis.; Pyrenastrum pyrenuloides (Mont.) Nyl.; Trypethelium pyrenuloides Mont.; Verrucaria pyrenuloides (Mont.) Nyl.

= Pyrenula pyrenuloides =

Species of lichen

Pyrenula pyrenuloides, also known by the common name wart lichen, is a species of corticolous (bark-dwelling), crustose lichen in the family Pyrenulaceae. It has a pantropical distribution.

== Description ==
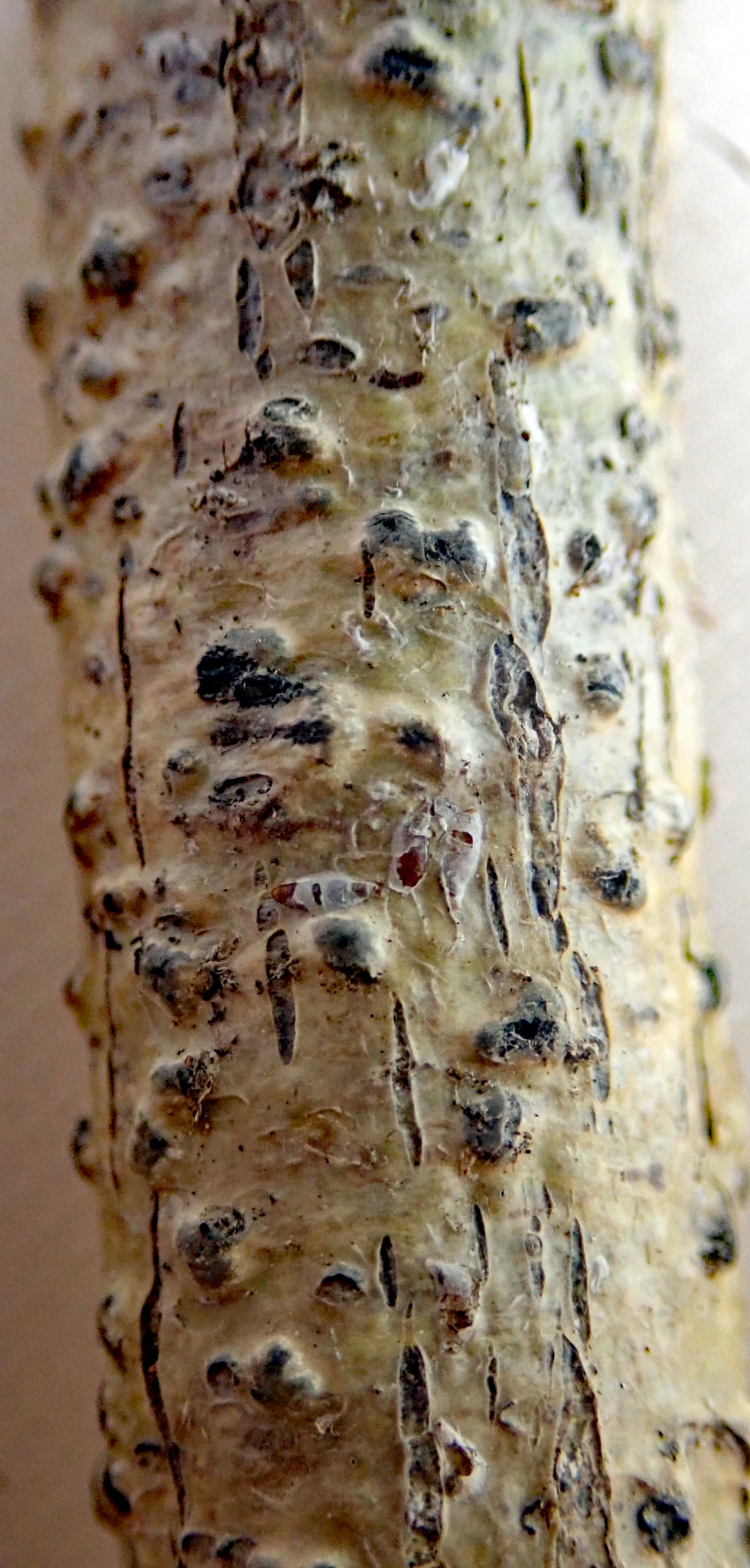
Pyrenula pyrenuloides on the bark of Myrsine salicina in New Zealand

Pyrenula pyrenuloides has a brown to olive green thallus with a pseudocyphellae, and black ascomata measuring up approximately 0.5–1.3 mm (0.020–0.051 in) in diameter. It can be differentiated from Pyrenula leucostoma, as Pyrenula pyrenuloides has a greater number of locules in its central rows, adn these tend to be less angular.

== Taxonomy ==
The lichen was formally described as a new species by Camille Montagne in 1843, who used the name Trypethelium pyrenuloides. The species was recombined in 1989 by Richard Clinton Harris, who placed it in the genus Pyrenula.

== Distribution ==
The species is primarily pantropical and subtropical, mostly found in open coastal areas. It is widespread in eastern Queensland and New South Wales in Australia, and was first recognised in New Zealand, when it was collected in Auckland from Pukematekeo in 2015 and Dingle Dell in 2016. The New Zealand specimens have been found in mixed indigenous forest and Podocarp forest, growing on lancewood.

== See also ==
- List of Pyrenula species
