= Leucostoma persoonii =

Scientific classification
- Kingdom: Fungi
- Division: Ascomycota
- Class: Sordariomycetes
- Order: Diaporthales
- Family: Valsaceae
- Genus: Leucostoma
- Species: L. persoonii

Binomial name
- Leucostoma persoonii (Nitschke) Höhn. (1928)

Synonyms
- Cytospora leucostoma Leucostoma leucostoma Sphaeria leucostoma Valsa leucostoma Valsa persoonii

Species of fungal plant pathogen

Leucostoma persoonii is a plant pathogen, which causes perennial canker (also referred to as Cytospora canker and Valsa canker or Leucostoma canker). On Species Fungorum the current name is given as Cytospora leucostoma (Pers.) Sacc., (1881)
