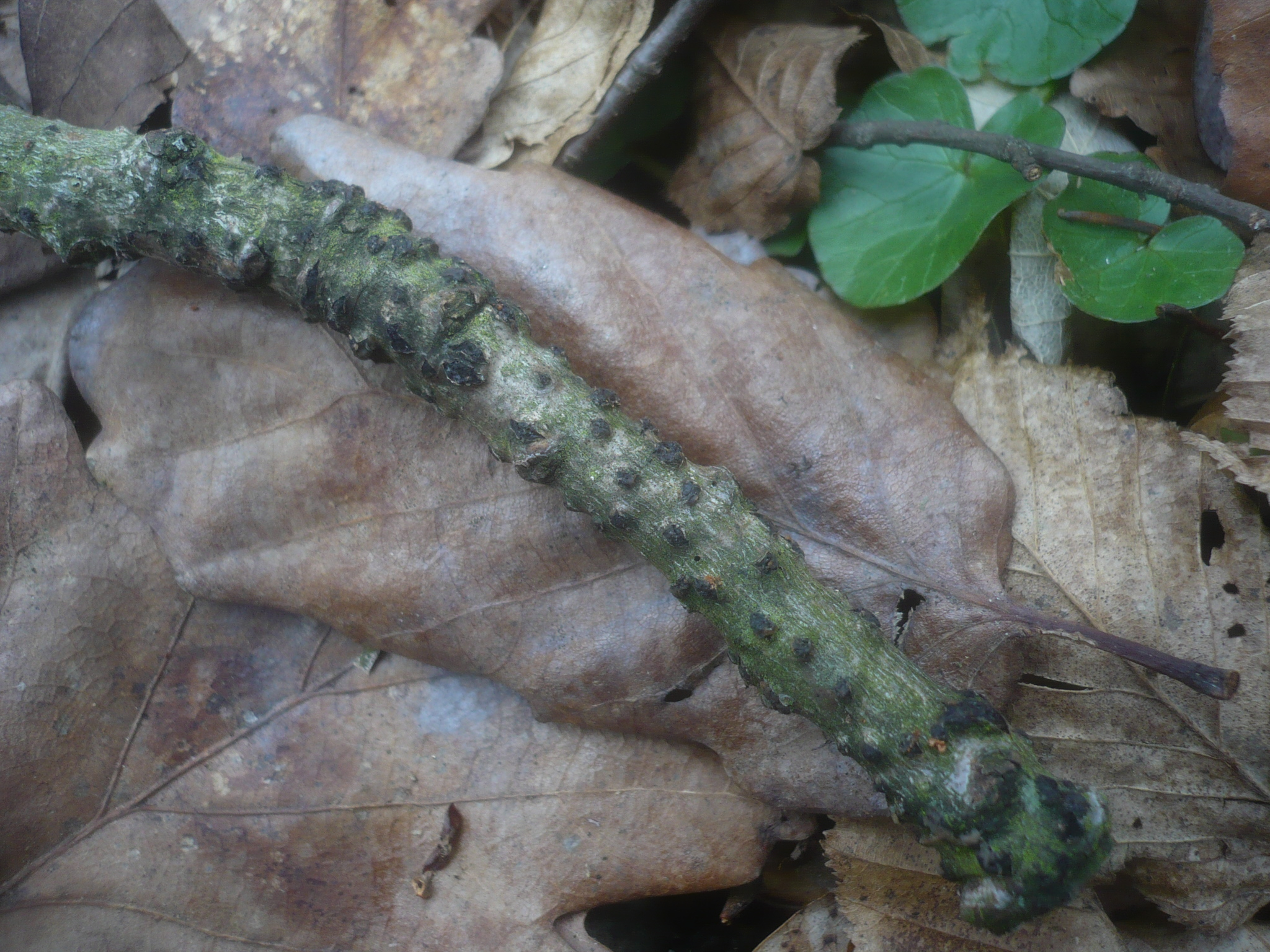
- Valsaria insitiva on an oak twig

Scientific classification
- Kingdom: Fungi
- Division: Ascomycota
- Class: Dothideomycetes
- Genus: Valsaria
- Species: V. insitiva

Binomial name
- Valsaria insitiva (Tode) Ces. & De Not.,(1863)

Synonyms
- Cytospora cincta Sacc., (1884); Cytospora rubescens Fr., (1823); Diatrype aethiops Cooke & Ellis; Diatrype cincta (Curr.) Berk. & Broome, (1859); Diatrype viticola Schwein. ex Berk., (1877); Dothidea rudis P. Karst. & Har. Leucocytospora cincta (Sacc.) Höhn.,: 62 (1928); Leucostoma cinctum (Fr.) Höhn. [as 'cincta'], (1928); Massariella syconophila (Schulzer) Sacc. Myrmaecium cinctum (Curr.) Lindau; Myrmaecium insitivum (Tode) Lindau; Pseudovalsa celtidis (Cooke) Cooke; Pseudovalsa clethraecola (Cooke & Ellis) Cooke; Pseudovalsa nigrifacta (Cooke & Ellis) Cooke; Pseudovalsa notarisii (Mont.) Cooke; Pseudovalsa phlyctaenodes (Mont.) Cooke; Sphaeria cincta Curr. Sphaeria cincta Fr., (1823); Sphaeria insitiva Tode; Sphaeria notarisii Mont. Sphaeria periplocae De Not. Sphaeria phlyctaenodes Mont. Sphaeria robiniae Schwein., (1822); Valsa celtidis Cooke, (1876); Valsa cincta (Fr.) Fr., Summa veg. Scand., (1849); Valsa cincta Curr.,: 411 (1849); Valsa clethraecola Cooke & Ellis; Valsa nigrifacta Cooke & Ellis [as 'nigrofacta'] Valsa notarisii (Mont.) Mont. Valsa phlyctaenodes (Mont.) Mont. Valsaria aethiops (Cooke & Ellis) Sacc. Valsaria atrata Sacc. & Briard, (1885); Valsaria batesii Doidge, (1948); Valsaria celtidis (Cooke) Sacc., (1882); Valsaria cincta (Curr.) Sacc., (1882); Valsaria citri Rehm; Valsaria clethraecola (Cooke & Ellis) Sacc. [as 'clethricola'] Valsaria consors Rehm; Valsaria cryptomeriae A.K. Kar & Maity, (1970); Valsaria farlowiana Sacc. Valsaria indica S.B. Kale, Sydowia 23(1-6): 194 (1970); Valsaria insitiva f. acaciae-caveniae Speg., (1909); Valsaria insitiva f. carpini-betulae Sacc. Valsaria insitiva f. celtidis Sacc. Valsaria insitiva f. cordiae-gerascanthi Speg. Valsaria insitiva f. deminuta-negundinis Sacc. Valsaria insitiva f. fraxini-orni Sacc. Valsaria insitiva f. gleditschiae Speg. Valsaria insitiva f. gleditschiae-triacanthi Sacc. Valsaria insitiva f. lusitanica Gonz. Frag. Valsaria insitiva f. mimosae-polycarpae Speg., (1909); Valsaria insitiva f. mori-albae Sacc. Valsaria insitiva f. paliuri-aculeati Sacc. Valsaria insitiva f. parkinsoniae Speg. Valsaria insitiva f. polygoni Speg. Valsaria insitiva f. quercus-pedunculatae Sacc. Valsaria insitiva f. rauwolfiae Speg. Valsaria insitiva f. robiniae-pseudacaciae Sacc. Valsaria insitiva f. ulmi-campestris Sacc. Valsaria insitiva f. wistariae Sacc. Valsaria insitiva var. coluteae Sacc. Valsaria insitiva var. linderae Sacc. Valsaria mata Rolland, (1905); Valsaria nigrifacta (Cooke & Ellis) Sacc. [as 'nigrificata'], (1882); Valsaria notarisii (Mont.) Sacc., Syll. fung. (Abellini) 1: 742 (1882); Valsaria periplocae (De Not.) Ces. & De Not. Valsaria phlyctaenodes (Mont.) Sacc. Valsaria robiniae (Schwein.) Cooke; Valsaria rudis (P. Karst. & Har.) Theiss. & Syd. ex Petr. & Syd., (1923); Valsaria spartii Maubl., Bull. Soc. mycol. Fr. 21: 88 (1905); Valsaria syconophila Schulzer; Valsaria viticola (Schwein. ex Berk.) Sacc. Valsaria zanthoxyli Ellis & Everh. [as 'xanthoxyli']

= Valsaria insitiva =

Species of fungus

Valsaria insitiva is a plant pathogen, that causes perennial canker in apples and almonds.

== See also ==
- List of apple diseases
- List of almond diseases
