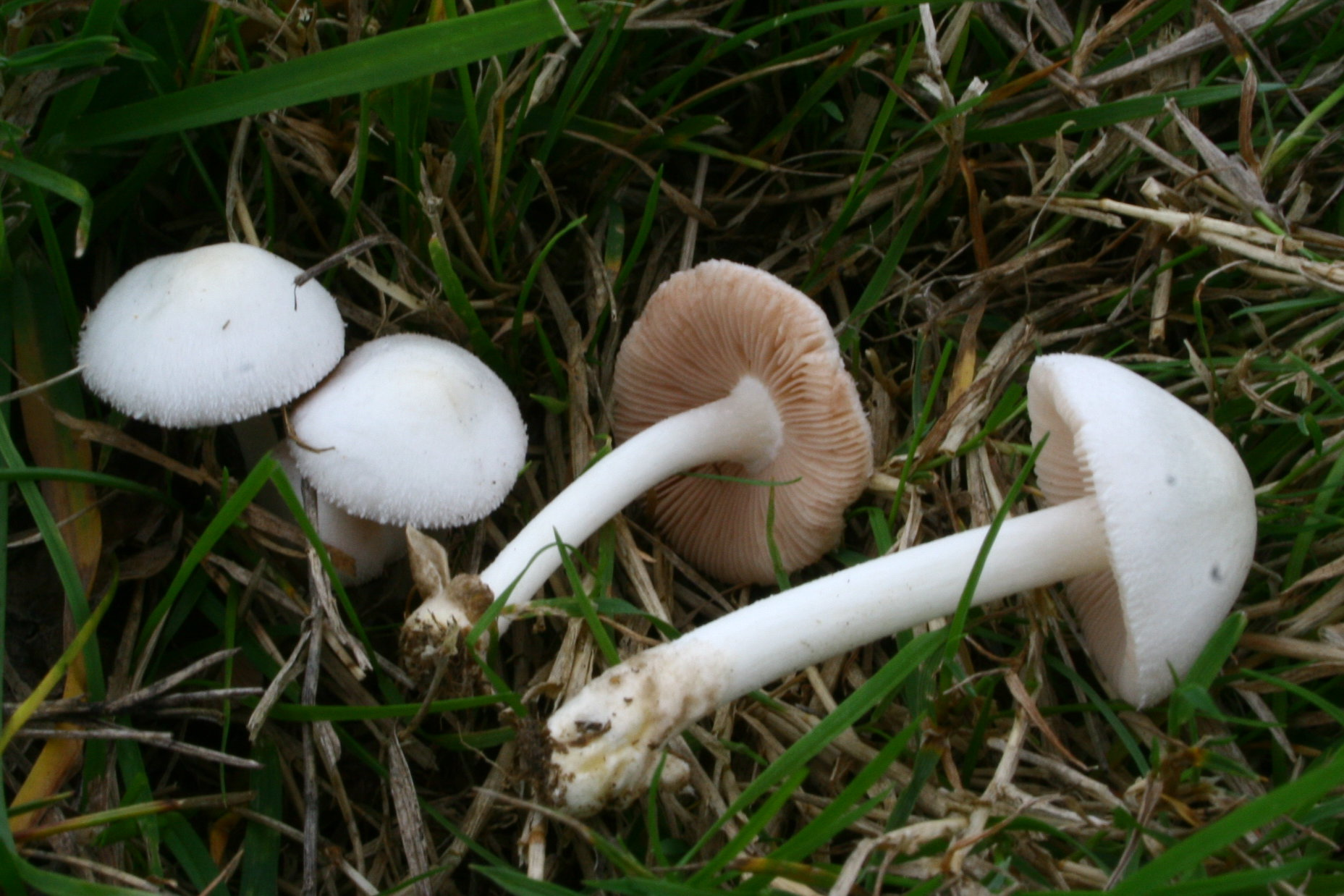

Scientific classification
- Domain: Eukaryota
- Kingdom: Fungi
- Division: Basidiomycota
- Class: Agaricomycetes
- Order: Agaricales
- Family: Pluteaceae
- Genus: Volvariella
- Species: V. pusilla

Binomial name
- Volvariella pusilla (Pers.) Singer

= Volvariella pusilla =

Species of fungus

Volvariella pusilla, is a species of agaric fungus in the family Pluteaceae, described by Rolf Singer in 1951.

== Morphology ==
Cap: 1 to 3 cm in diameter, bell-shaped at first, then expands. The skin is silky-stringy when young, slightly sticky, white, the flesh is cream-colored, the edge is more stringy and sometimes cracked.

Lamellae: Free, white when young and pink colored when the spores mature. Lamellae come close to the stipe, but do not touch it.

Stipe: White and thin.

== Distribution and habitat ==
It was noted in Asia and Europe, North America, Africa and Australia, with the most sightings in Europe. It grows in forests, parks, botanical gardens, allotment gardens, by the roads, sometimes close to houses, on the ground, in grass.
