= Nigrospora =

Scientific classification
- Domain: Eukaryota
- Kingdom: Fungi
- Division: Ascomycota
- Class: Sordariomycetes
- Order: Trichosphaeriales
- Family: Trichosphaeriaceae
- Genus: Nigrospora; Zimm.

Genus of fungi

Nigrospora is a genus of fungi in the family Trichosphaeriaceae.

The genus has a cosmopolitan distribution. Fossils have been found in 12-million-year-old rocks from central England.

== Species ==
- Nigrospora aerophila Bat. & Siqueira (1960)
- Nigrospora arundinacea (Cooke & Massee) Potl. (1952)
- Nigrospora aurantiaca Mei Wang & L. Cai (2017)
- Nigrospora bambusae Mei Wang & L. Cai (2017)
- Nigrospora brasiliensis A.C.Q. Brito, C. Conforto & A.R. Machado (2019)
- Nigrospora camelliae-sinensis Mei Wang & L. Cai (2017)
- Nigrospora canescens McLennan & Hoëtte (1933)
- Nigrospora chinensis Mei Wang & L. Cai (2017)
- Nigrospora falsivesicularis M. Raza & L. Cai (2019)
- Nigrospora gorlenkoana Novobr. (1972)
- Nigrospora guilinensis Mei Wang & L. Cai (2017)
- Nigrospora hainanensis Mei Wang & L. Cai (2017)
- Nigrospora javanica Palm (1918)
- Nigrospora lacticolonia Mei Wang & L. Cai (2017)
- Nigrospora macarangae Tennakoon, C.H. Kuo & K.D. Hyde (2021)
- Nigrospora magnoliae N.I. de Silva, Lumyong & K.D. Hyde (2021)
- Nigrospora maydis (Garov.) Hol.-Jech. (1963)
- Nigrospora musae McLennan & Hoëtte (1933)
- Nigrospora oryzae (Berk. & Broome) Petch (1924)
- Nigrospora osmanthi Mei Wang & L. Cai (2017)
- Nigrospora padwickii Prasad, Agnihotri & J.P. Agarwal (1960)
- Nigrospora panici Zimm. (1902)
- Nigrospora pyriformis Mei Wang & L. Cai (2017)
- Nigrospora rubi Mei Wang & L. Cai (2017)
- Nigrospora sacchari (Speg.) E.W. Mason (1927)
- Nigrospora saccharicola M. Raza & L. Cai (2019)
- Nigrospora sacchari-officinarum M. Raza & L. Cai (2019)
- Nigrospora singularis M. Raza & L. Cai (2019)
- Nigrospora vesicularifera M. Raza & L. Cai (2019)
- Nigrospora vesicularis Mei Wang & L. Cai (2017)
- Nigrospora zimmermanii Crous (2017)
