= Colletotrichum dematium =

Scientific classification
- Kingdom: Fungi
- Division: Ascomycota
- Class: Sordariomycetes
- Order: Glomerellales
- Family: Glomerellaceae
- Genus: Colletotrichum
- Species: C. dematium

Binomial name
- Colletotrichum dematium (Pers.) Grove, (1918)

Synonyms
- Colletotrichum bakeri (Syd. & P. Syd.) Mundk., (1938); Colletotrichum brassicae Schulzer & Sacc., (1884); Colletotrichum lysimachiae Duke, (1928); Colletotrichum pucciniophilum Togashi, (1936); Colletotrichum sanguisorbae Bres., (1894); Colletotrichum volutella Sacc. & Malbr., (1882); Dinemasporium dianthi (Westend.) Oudem. Ellisiellina volutella (Sacc.) Bat., (1956); Sphaeria dematium Pers., (1801); Vermicularia bakeri Syd. & P. Syd., (1916); Vermicularia dematium (Pers.) Fr., (1829); Vermicularia dianthi Westend. Vermicularia echinata Kirschst., (1939); Vermicularia lagunensis Syd. & P. Syd., (1916); Vermicularia lysimachiae (Duke) Vassiljevsky, (1950); Vermicularia volutella (Sacc. & Malbr.) Grove, (1937)

Species of fungus

Colletotrichum dematium is a plant pathogen causing anthracnose.

Colletotrichum dematium has a significant role as a cause of anthracnose in the Japanese radishes and its ability to cause rare fungal keratitis in humans. This information highlights both the agricultural impact of the fungus and its relevance medically. The research shows how C. dematium is a serious problem for the farmers in Japan and how it affects their crops.
