= List of fungi of South Africa – D =

This is an alphabetical list of the fungal taxa as recorded from South Africa. Currently accepted names have been appended.

== Da ==
Genus: Dacryomitra

- Dacryomitra dubia Llovd.

Genus: Dacryomyces

- Dacryomyces australis Lloyd.
- Dacryomyces deliquescens Duby.
- Dacryomyces digressus Lloyd.
- Dacryomyces tortus Fr.

Genus: Dactylina (Lichens)

- Dactylina mollusca Tuck.

Genus: Daedalea

- Daedalea biennis Fr.
- Daedalea dregeana Mont.
- Daedalea eatoni Berk.
- Daedalea fuscospora Lloyd.
- Daedalea hobbsii v.d.Byl.
- Daedalea ligneotexta v.d.Byl.
- Daedalea macowani Kalchbr. ex Thuem.
- Daedalea ochracea Kalchbr. ex Thuem.
- Daedalea quercina Fr.
- Daedalea rhodesica v.d. Byl.
- Daedalea stereoides Fr.
- Daedalea unicolor Fr.

Genus: Daldinia

- Daldinia bakeri Lloyd.
- Daldinia concentrica Ces. & De Not.
- Daldinia concentrica var. eschscholzii Ehrenb. ex Fr.
- Daldinia eschscholzii Rehm.

Genus: Darluca

- Darluca filum Cast.
- Darluca vagans Cast.

Genus: Dasyscypha

- Dasyscypha calyculaeformis Rehm.
- Dasyscypha lachnoderma Rehm.

== De ==
Genus: Deconica

- Deconica atro-rufa Sacc.

Genus: Delitschia

- Delitschia bisporula Hans.
- Delitschia sp.

Family: Dematiaceae

Genus: Dendroecia

- Dendroecia evansii Syd.

Genus: Dendrogaster

- Dendrogaster radiatus Zeller & Dodge

Genus: Dendryphium

- Dendryphium macowanianum Thuem.

Genus: Depazea

- Depazea briddleyae Thuem.
- Depazea nesodes Thuem.

Genus: Dermatea

- Dermatea pelidna Kalchbr. & Cooke
- Dermatea rufa Cooke

Family: Dermateaceae

Genus: Dermatina

- Dermatina pyrenocarpa Zahlbr.

Genus: Dermatiscum (Lichens)

- Dermatiscum thunbergii Nyl
- Dermatiscum viride Zahlbr.

Family: Dermatocarpaceae

Genus: Dermatocarpon (Lichens)

- Dermatocarpon deserti Zahlbr.
- Dermatocarpon finckei Zahlbr.
- Dermatocarpon hepaticum Th.Fr.
- Dermatocarpon peltatum Zahlbr.

== Di ==
Genus: Diacham

- Diacham elegans Fr.

Genus: Diachaea

- Diachaea leucopoda Rost.

Genus: Diachora

- Diachora lessertiae Petrak.

Genus: Diathrypton

- Diathrypton radians Syd.

Genus: Diaporthe

- Diaporthe citri Wolf.
- Diaporthe pemiciosa E.Marchal.

Family: Diaportheae

Genus: Diatrype

- Diatrype auristroma Doidge
- Diatrype bona-spei Berl.
- Diatrype caminata Kalchbr. & Cooke
- Diatrype capensis Kalchbr. & Cooke
- Diatrype caulina Syd.
- Diatrype conferta Doidge
- Diatrype congesta Kalchbr. & Cooke
- Diatrype dovyalidis Doidge
- Diatrype durieui Mont.
- Diatrype leonotidis Doidge
- Diatrype macowaniana Thuem.
- Diatrype xumenensis Doidge

Genus: Diatrypella

- Diatrypella agaves Syd.
- Diatrypella morganae Doidge
- Diatrypella natalensis Doidge
- Diatrypella oligostroma Syd.
- Diatrypella pretoriensis Doidge

Genus: Dicaeoma

- Dicaeoma arundinellae Syd.
- Dicaeoma rottboelliae Syd.

Genus: Dichlamys

- Dichlamys trollipi Syd.

Genus: Dichodium

- Dichodium byrsinum Nyl.
- Dichodium subluridum Nyl.

Genus: Dictothrix

- Dictothrix erysiphina Theiss.

Genus: Dictyocephalos

- Dictyocephalos attenuatus Long & Plunkett.

Genus: Dictyochorella

- Dictyochorella andropogonis Doidge

Genus: Dictyophora

- Dictyophora indusiata Desv.
- Dictyophora phalloidea Desv.

Genus: Diderma (Slime moulds)

- Diderma effusum Morg.
- Diderma hemisphericum Homem.
- Diderma subdictyospermum Lister.

Genus: Didymella

- Didymella intercepta Sacc.
- Didymella lycopersici Kleb.
- Didymella maculiformis Wint.
- Didymella zuluensis Doidge.

Genus: Didvmellina

- Didvmellina dianthi Burt.

Genus: Didymosphaeria

- Didymosphaeria clavata du Pless.
- Didymosphaeria opulenta Sacc.
- Didymosphaeria populina Vuill.
- Didymosphaeria rafniae Verw. & du Pless.
- Didymosphaeria spatharum Wint.

Genus: Didymosporina

- Didymosporina africana Syd.

Genus: Didymosporium

- Didymosporium congestum Syd.
- Didymosporium latum Syd.

Genus: Dimeriella

- Dimeriella annulata Syd.
- Dimeriella claviseta Doidge
- Dimeriella grewiae Theiss.
- Dimeriella woodii Hansf.

Genus: Dimerina

- Dimerina osyridis Theiss.
- Dimerina parasitica Hansf.
- Dimerina verrucicola Theiss.

Genus: Dimerium

- Dimerium africanum Hansf.
- Dimerium baccharidicolum Sacc.
- Dimerium englerianum Sacc. & D.Sacc.
- Dimerium erysiphinum Sacc.
- Dimerium gymnosporiae Syd.
- Dimerium intermedium Syd.
- Dimerium langloisii Theiss.
- Dimerium leonense Hansf.
- Dimerium lepidogathis Sacc.
- Dimerium leptosporum Speg.
- Dimerium macowanianum Doidge
- Dimerium minutum Sacc.
- Dimerium myriadeum Theiss.
- Dimerium piceum Theiss.
- Dimerium psilostomatis Sacc.
- Dimerium pulveraceum Theiss.
- Dimerium radio-fissilis Sacc.
- Dimerium subferrugineum Syd.

Genus: Dimerosporiopsis

- Dimerosporiopsis engleriana P.Henn.

Genus: Dimerosporium

- Dimerosporium acocantherae P.Henn.
- Dimerosporium englerianum P.Henn.
- Dimerosporium erysiphinum P.Henn.
- Dimerosporium gymnosporiae P.Henn.
- Dimerosporium lepidagathis P.Henn.
- Dimerosporium macowanianum Sacc.
- Dimerosporium osyridis Wint.
- Dimerosporium psilostomatis Sacc.
- Dimerosporium verrucicolum Wint.
- Dimerosporium sp.

Genus: Diorchidium

- Diorchidium tricholaenae Syd.
- Diorchidium woodii Kalchbr. & Cooke

Genus: Diplocarpon

- Diplocarpon earliana Wolf.
- Diplocarpon rosae Wolf.

Genus: Diplochorella

- Diplochorella amphimelaena Theiss. & Syd.
- Diplochorella burchelliae Syd.

Genus: Diplocystis

- Diplocystis junodii Pole Evans & Bottomley

Genus: Diplodia

- Diplodia aurantii Catt.
- Diplodia cassinopsidis Kalchbr. & Cooke.
- Diplodia clematidea Sacc.
- Diplodia clematidis Kalchbr. & Cooke
- Diplodia herbarum Lev.
- Diplodia lichenopsis Cooke & Mass.
- Diplodia maydis Sacc.
- Diplodia monsterae Verw. & Dipp.
- Diplodia natalensis Pole Evans
- Diplodia palmicola Thuem.
- Diplodia pinea Kickx.
- Diplodia sarmentorum Fr.
- Diplodia tubericola Taubenh.
- Diplodia variispora Died.
- Diplodia vignae Sacc.

Family: Diploschistaceae

Genus: Diploschistella

- Diploschistella urceolata Vain.

Genus: Diploschistes (Lichens)

- Diploschistes actinostomus Zahlbr.
- Diploschistes actinostomus var. aeneus Steiner
- Diploschistes actinostomus var. caesioplumbeus Steiner
- Diploschistes anactinus Zahlbr.
- Diploschistes bellus Zahlbr.
- Diploschistes cinereocaesius Wain.
- Diploschistes deuterius Zahlbr.
- Diploschistes isabellinus Zahlbr.
- Diploschistes ochroniger Zahlbr.
- Diploschistes perispicillatus Zahlbr.
- Diploschistes scruposus Norm.
- Diploschistes scruposus f. iridatus Zahlbr.
- Diploschistes scruposus var. arenarius Müll.Arg.
- Diploschistes subcupreus Zahlbr.

Family: Dirinaceae

Genus: Dirina (Lichens)

- Dirina capensis Fée.

Genus: Discina

- Discina submembranaceae P. Henn.

Genus: Disciseda

- Disciseda anomala G.H.Cunn.
- Disciseda candida Lloyd.
- Disciseda candida Bottomley.
- Disciseda cervina Hollos.
- Disciseda hypogaea Cunningham.
- Disciseda juglandiformis Hollos.
- Disciseda pedicellata Hollos.
- Disciseda verrucosa G.H.Cunn.
- Disciseda zeyheri Hollos.

Genus: Discomyces

- Discomyces madurae Gedoelst
- Discomyces pijperi Neveu-Lemaire.

== Do ==
Genus: Dothidasteromella

- Dothidasteromella contorta Doidge
- Dothidasteromella orbiculata Syd.

Family: Dothideaceae

Genus: Dothidea

- Dothidea aloicola P.Henn.
- Dothidea amphimelaena Mont.
- Dothidea arduina Kalchbr. & Cooke
- Dothidea circinata Kalchbr. & Cooke
- Dothidea crotonis Cooke
- Dothidea kniphojiae Kalchbr. & Cooke
- Dothidea lucens Cooke
- Dothidea melianthi Kalchbr. & Cooke
- Dothidea oleifolia Kalchbr. & Cooke
- Dothidea perisporioides Berk. & Curt.
- Dothidea puncta Cooke
- Dothidea repens Berk
- Dothidea scabies Kalchbr. & Cooke
- Dothidea strelitziae Cooke
- Dothidea viventis var. albizziae Cooke

Genus: Dothidella

- Dothidella osyridis Berl. & Vogl.
- Dothidella osyridis var. tassiana Sacc.
- Dothidella welwitschii A.L.Sm.

Genus: Dothidina

- Dothidina disciformis Theiss. & Syd.

Genus: Dothiopsis

- Dothiopsis stangeriae Verw. & du Pless.

Genus: Dothiorella

- Dothiorella congesta Sacc.
- Dothiorella mali Ell. & Everh.
- Dothiorella reniformis Vi. & Rav.
- Dothiorella senecionis Petrak.

== Du ==
Genus: Dufourea

- Dufourea flammea Ach.
- Dufourea mollusca Ach.
- Dufourea physcioides Massal.
- Dufourea plumbea Tayl.

== See also ==
- List of fungi of South Africa
- List of fungi of South Africa – A
- List of fungi of South Africa – B
- List of fungi of South Africa – C
- List of fungi of South Africa – E
- List of fungi of South Africa – F
- List of fungi of South Africa – G
- List of fungi of South Africa – H
- List of fungi of South Africa – I
- List of fungi of South Africa – J
- List of fungi of South Africa – K
- List of fungi of South Africa – L
- List of fungi of South Africa – M
- List of fungi of South Africa – N
- List of fungi of South Africa – O
- List of fungi of South Africa – P
- List of fungi of South Africa – Q
- List of fungi of South Africa – R
- List of fungi of South Africa – S
- List of fungi of South Africa – T
- List of fungi of South Africa – U
- List of fungi of South Africa – V
- List of fungi of South Africa – W
- List of fungi of South Africa – X
- List of fungi of South Africa – Y
- List of fungi of South Africa – Z
