= Vestergrenia =

Scientific classification
- Domain: Eukaryota
- Kingdom: Fungi
- Division: Ascomycota
- Class: Dothideomycetes
- Order: Dothideales
- Family: Dothideaceae
- Genus: Vestergrenia; Rehm., 1901

Type species
- Vestergrenia nervisequia Rehm (1901)

Synonyms
- Catacaumella Theissen & H.Sydow, 1915; Coscinopeltella Chardón, 1930; Whetzelia C.E.Chardon & R.A.Toro, 1934

Genus of fungi

Vestergrenia is a genus of fungi belonging to the family Dothideaceae. The type species is Vestergrenia nervisequia.

The genus was circumscribed by Heinrich Simon Ludwig Friedrich Felix Rehm in Hedwigia vol.40 on page 100 in 1901.

The genus name of Vestergrenia is in honour of Jacob Tycho Conrad Vestergren (1875–1930), who was a Swedish teacher and botanist (Mycology). He taught chemistry und botany at various schools and university institutions in Stockholm.

== Affects ==
It has been found on the dead stems of Cryptostegia grandiflora in Kannad, India. It causes roundish, dark brown spots about 1mm wide. In New Zealand, Vestergrenia leucopogonis Hansf. 1957 was found on Cyathodes fasciculata and Leucopogon fasciculatus.

== Distribution ==
The genus has almost cosmopolitan distribution, for example species Vestergrenia multipunctata (G. Winter) Arx & E. Müll. (1954) is found in New Zealand, with Vestergrenia leucopogonis Hansf. 1957. While specimens of Vestergrenia nervisequia Rehm were found in Rio de Janeiro, Brazil. Vestergrenia pandani P.B. Chavan & Hosag. (1984) has been recorded in India.

== Species ==
As accepted by Species Fungorum;

- Vestergrenia achyranthis (T.S. Ramakr.) Arx & E. Müll. (1954)
- Vestergrenia atropurpurea (Chardón) Wulandari (2014)
- Vestergrenia bosei E. Müll. (1958)
- Vestergrenia cestri (Pat.) Arx & E. Müll. (1954)
- Vestergrenia chaenostoma (Sacc.) Theiss. (1918)
- Vestergrenia clerodendri (Syd. & P. Syd.) Theiss. (1918)
- Vestergrenia clusiae Petr. (1963)
- Vestergrenia daphniphylli Tak. Kobay. (1976)
- Vestergrenia dinochloae (Rehm) Wulandari (2014)
- Vestergrenia egenula (Syd.) Arx & E. Müll. (1954)
- Vestergrenia globosa I. Hino & Katum. (1958)
- Vestergrenia indica Anahosur (1971)
- Vestergrenia ixorae C. Ramesh (1988)
- Vestergrenia justiciae (F. Stevens) Petr. (1934)
- Vestergrenia kamatii Anahosur (1976)
- Vestergrenia leucopogonis Hansf. (1957)
- Vestergrenia multipunctata (G. Winter) Arx & E. Müll. (1954)
- Vestergrenia neolitseae I. Hino & Katum. (1964)
- Vestergrenia nervisequia Rehm (1901)
- Vestergrenia pandani P.B. Chavan & Hosag. (1984)
- Vestergrenia pipericola (F. Stevens) Petr. (1934)
- Vestergrenia sarcococcae E. Müll. (1958)
- Vestergrenia tetrazygiae (F. Stevens) Wulandari (2014)
- Vestergrenia venezuelensis (Chardón & Toro) Arx & E. Müll. (1954)

Former species;

- V. heterostemmatis (T.S. Ramakr. & K. Ramakr.) Arx & E. Müll. (1954) = Guignardia heterostemmatis, Phyllostictaceae family
- V. micheliae (Syd.) Arx & E. Müll. (1954) = Phyllachorella micheliae, Dothideaceae
- V. umbellata (Vestergr.) Died. (1913) = Petasodes umbellata, Diaporthaceae family
