= Xanthoparmelia rankinensis =

Scientific classification
- Kingdom: Fungi
- Division: Ascomycota
- Class: Lecanoromycetes
- Order: Lecanorales
- Family: Parmeliaceae
- Genus: Xanthoparmelia
- Species: X. rankinensis

Binomial name
- Xanthoparmelia rankinensis Elix (2004)
- Holotype: Lachlan Range State Forest, New South Wales, Australia

Species of lichen

Xanthoparmelia rankinensis is a rare species of foliose lichen in the family Parmeliaceae. Named after Rankins Springs near its type locality, this soil-dwelling lichen is known only from the Lachlan Range State Forest in New South Wales, Australia. It forms circular rosettes up to 5 cm wide with yellow-green, spotted lobes and a dark lower surface. The species grows in Callitris-dominated forest alongside several other lichen species and can be identified by its circular growth pattern, spotted upper surface, small lobes along its margins, and its chemical composition featuring usnic acid, salazinic acid and norstictic acid. It is distinguishable from similar species by its spotted surface, dark underside, and distinct chemical profile.

== Taxonomy ==
Xanthoparmelia rankinensis was described as a new species by the lichenologist John A. Elix in 2004. The type specimen was collected in Lachlan Range State Forest, 15 km northwest of Rankins Springs, New South Wales, Australia at an elevation of 260 m. The species epithet rankinensis derives from the Latin suffix "-ensis" meaning "place of origin" and refers to Rankins Springs, the township in the vicinity of the type locality.

== Description ==
The lichen forms a leafy body (thallus) that is loosely attached (adnate) to its substrate surface, creating circular patterns (rosettes) up to 5 cm in width. Its lobes are separate to loosely overlapping, elongated and linear in shape, branching in patterns that fork into two, spreading outward, and measure 0.8–2 mm wide. The upper surface is yellow to yellow-green, flat to slightly rounded, smooth, with spots (maculate) especially near the lobe tips, and lacks finger-like projections (isidia) or powdery structures (soredia) but has small lobes (lobulae). These small lobes are somewhat linear, unbranched or rarely forked into two, and 0.2–0.5 mm wide. The inner layer (medulla) is white, while the lower surface is partly grooved (canaliculate), smooth, dark brown to brown-black. The root-like attachments (rhizines) are sparse to moderately dense, simple or very rarely forked, black, 0.5–1.5 mm long, and extend beyond the edge of the lobes. The specimen had only underdeveloped reproductive discs (apothecia). The asexual spores (conidia) are rod-shaped to weakly spindle-shaped, measuring 3–5 by 0.7 μm.

Xanthoparmelia rankinensis belongs to the X. amphixantha group and is characterised by the foliose thallus that forms rosettes on soil, the convex upper surface with white maculation (particularly towards the lobe tips), the dark brown to brown-black lower surface that is partly canaliculate, the absence of isidia, and the distinctive chemistry of its medulla. It contains usnic acid (major), salazinic acid (major), norstictic acid (submajor), protocetraric acid (trace), and consalazinic acid (trace). It most closely resembles X. bellatula but differs in having a maculate upper surface, a dark lower surface, and substantial quantities of norstictic acid.

== Habitat and distribution ==
Xanthoparmelia rankinensis is known only from its type locality in New South Wales, Australia, where it grows on soil in Callitris-dominated forest on a moderate slope. At this location, it grows together with various other lichens: Aspicilia contorta, Pulchrocladia corallaizon, Diploschistes hensseniae, Heterodea muelleri, Heterodea beaugleholei, and Psora decipiens.

== See also ==
- List of Xanthoparmelia species
