= Leucopogon diversifolius =

Scientific classification
- Kingdom: Plantae
- Clade: Tracheophytes
- Clade: Angiosperms
- Clade: Eudicots
- Clade: Asterids
- Order: Ericales
- Family: Ericaceae
- Genus: Leucopogon
- Species: L. diversifolius

Binomial name
- Leucopogon diversifolius Hislop
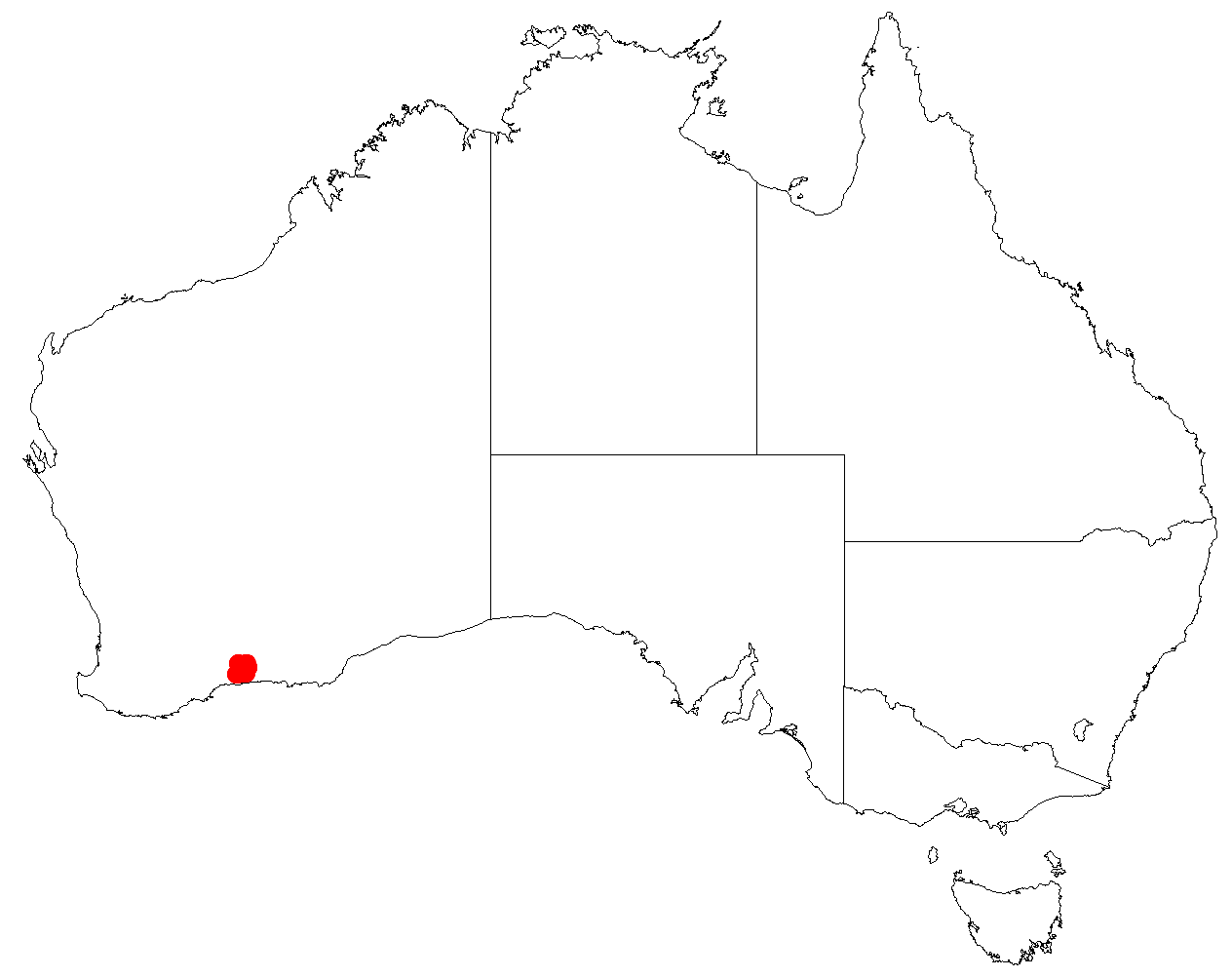
- Occurrence data from AVH

Species of plant

Leucopogon diversifolius is a species of flowering plant in the heath family Ericaceae and is endemic to the south-west of Western Australia. It is an erect shrub with more or less glabrous young branchlets, spirally arranged, erect, broadly egg-shaped, elliptic or more or less circular leaves, and white, broadly bell-shaped flowers sometimes with a pink tinge.

== Description ==
Leucopogon diversifolius is an erect shrub that typically grows up to about 150 cm (59 in) high and 120 cm (47 in) wide with a single stem at the base. The leaves are spirally arranged and point upwards, egg-shaped to elliptic or more or less circular, 2.0–6.4 mm (0.079–0.252 in) long and 1.9–4.7 mm (0.075–0.185 in) wide on a petiole 0.6–1.3 mm (0.024–0.051 in) long. The flowers are arranged in groups of 3 to 10, 3–10 mm (0.12–0.39 in) long on the ends of branches and in upper leaf axils, with egg-shaped bracts 0.5–0.8 mm (0.020–0.031 in) long and similar bracteoles 0.9–1.5 mm (0.035–0.059 in) long. The sepals are egg-shaped, 1.9–2.6 mm (0.075–0.102 in) long and tinged with purple near the tip, the petals white and joined at the base to form a broadly bell-shaped tube 1.3–2.0 mm (0.051–0.079 in) long, the lobes 1.9–3.5 mm (0.075–0.138 in) long and often tinged with pink. Flowering mainly occurs from May to July and the fruit is a cylindrical drupe 1.8–2.8 mm (0.071–0.110 in) long.

== Taxonomy and naming ==
This leucopogon as was first formally described in 2009 by Michael Clyde Hislop who gave it the name Leucopogon heterophyllus in the journal Nuytsia from specimens he collected near Munglinup in 2007, but that name was illegitimate because it had already been used for a different species, now known as Leucopogon fasciculatus. In 2015, Hislop changed the name to Leucopogon diversifolius. The specific epithet (diversifolius) means "various-leaved", referring to the variable leaf morphology of this species.

== Distribution and habitat ==
Leucopogon diversifolius grows in the shrub layer of mallee woodlands and occurs mainly between Ravensthorpe, Lake King and Cascade in the Esperance Plains and Mallee bioregions in south-western Western Australia.

== Conservation status ==
Leucopogon diversifolius is classified as "not threatened" by the Western Australian Government Department of Biodiversity, Conservation and Attractions
