= D. grandis =

D. grandis may refer to:

- Daemonorops grandis, a rattan palm species found in Asia
- Daldinia grandis, a fungus species in the genus Daldinia
- Deinodon grandis, a nomen dubium (may refer to Ornithomimus grandis or Aublysodon grandis)
- Dendropanax grandis, a tree species in the genus Dendropanax found in the Caribbean
- Dryptosauroides grandis, a dinosaur species found in India that lived during the Late Cretaceous

== See also ==
- Grandis (disambiguation)
