= Semidelitschia =

Scientific classification
- Kingdom: Fungi
- Division: Ascomycota
- Class: Dothideomycetes
- Order: Pleosporales
- Family: Delitschiaceae
- Genus: Semidelitschia; Cain & Luck-Allen (1969)

Type species
- Semidelitschia agasmatica Cain & Luck-Allen (1969)

Genus of fungi

Semidelitschia is a genus of coprophilous fungi in the family Delitschiaceae that contains three species. Semidelitschia was circumscribed in 1969 by mycologists Roy Cain and Robena Luck-Allen to contain the type species, Semidelitschia agasmatica Cain & Luck-Allen, found in North America. Semidelitschia tetraspora J.H. Mirza & S.M. Khan (found in Pakistan) and Semidelitschia nanostellata A.E. Bell & Mahoney (from Australia) were added to the genus in 1979 and 2001, respectively. The genus is characterized by species with one-celled, dark ascospores, which distinguishes it from the related genus Delitschia (Delitschiaceae), which have two-celled ascospores.
