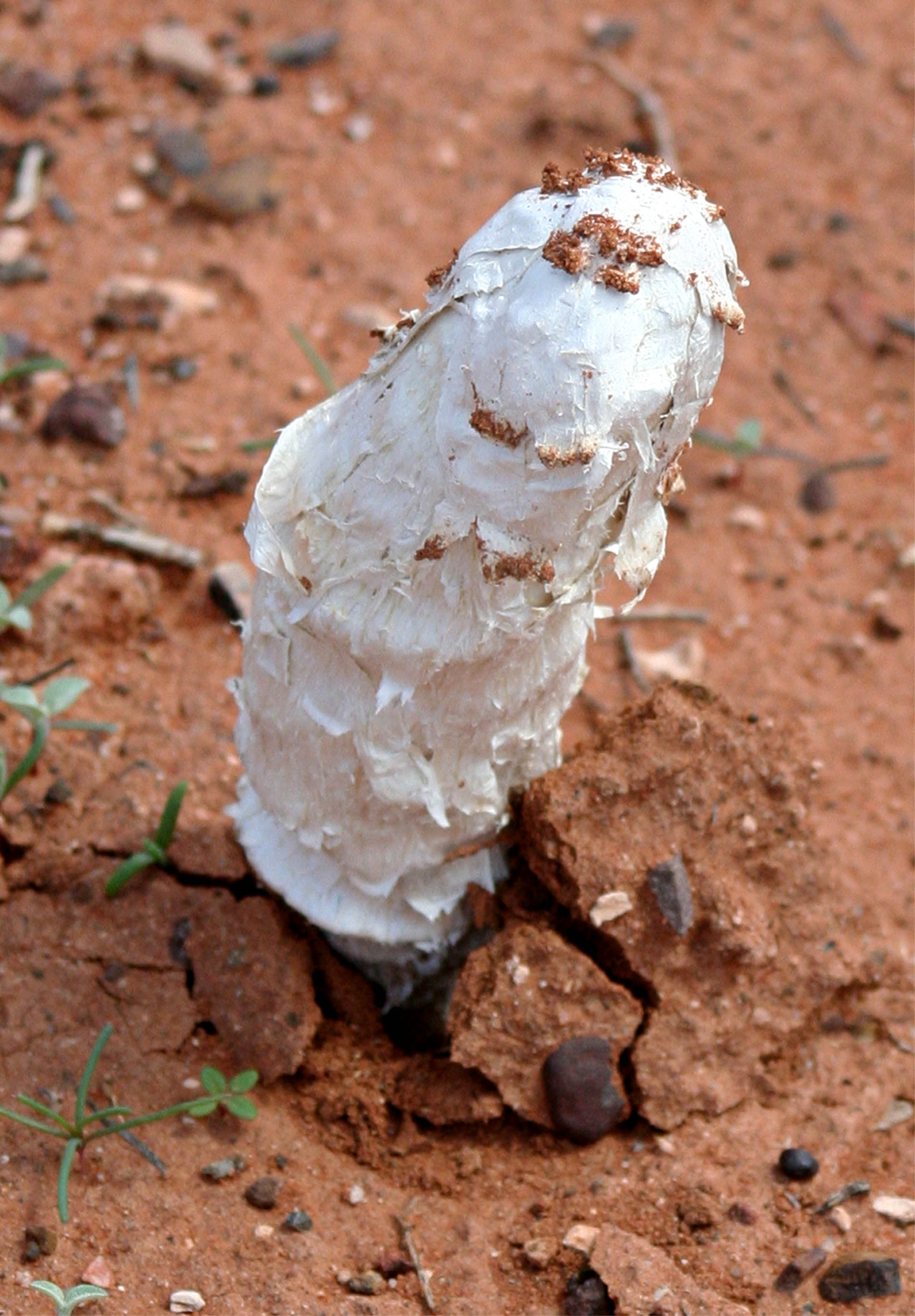
- Phellorinia herculeana

Scientific classification
- Kingdom: Fungi
- Division: Basidiomycota
- Class: Agaricomycetes
- Order: Agaricales
- Family: Phelloriniaceae
- Genus: Phellorinia; Berk. (1843)

Type species
- Phellorinia herculeana (Pers.) Kreisel (1961)

Synonyms
- Xylopodium Mont. (1845); Areolaria Kalchbr. (1883); Cyphellomyces Speg. (1906)

= Phellorinia =

Genus of fungi

Phellorinia is a genus of fungi in the family Phelloriniaceae of the order Agaricales. The genus is monotypic, and contains the single species Phellorinia herculeana, described by English naturalist Miles Joseph Berkeley in 1843 as P. inquinans. This single species has currently (February 2021) 24 synonyms, and takes its epithet from the basionym Scleroderma herculeanum Pers.

The spores were used for body decoration by Australian Aboriginal groups in desert areas.
