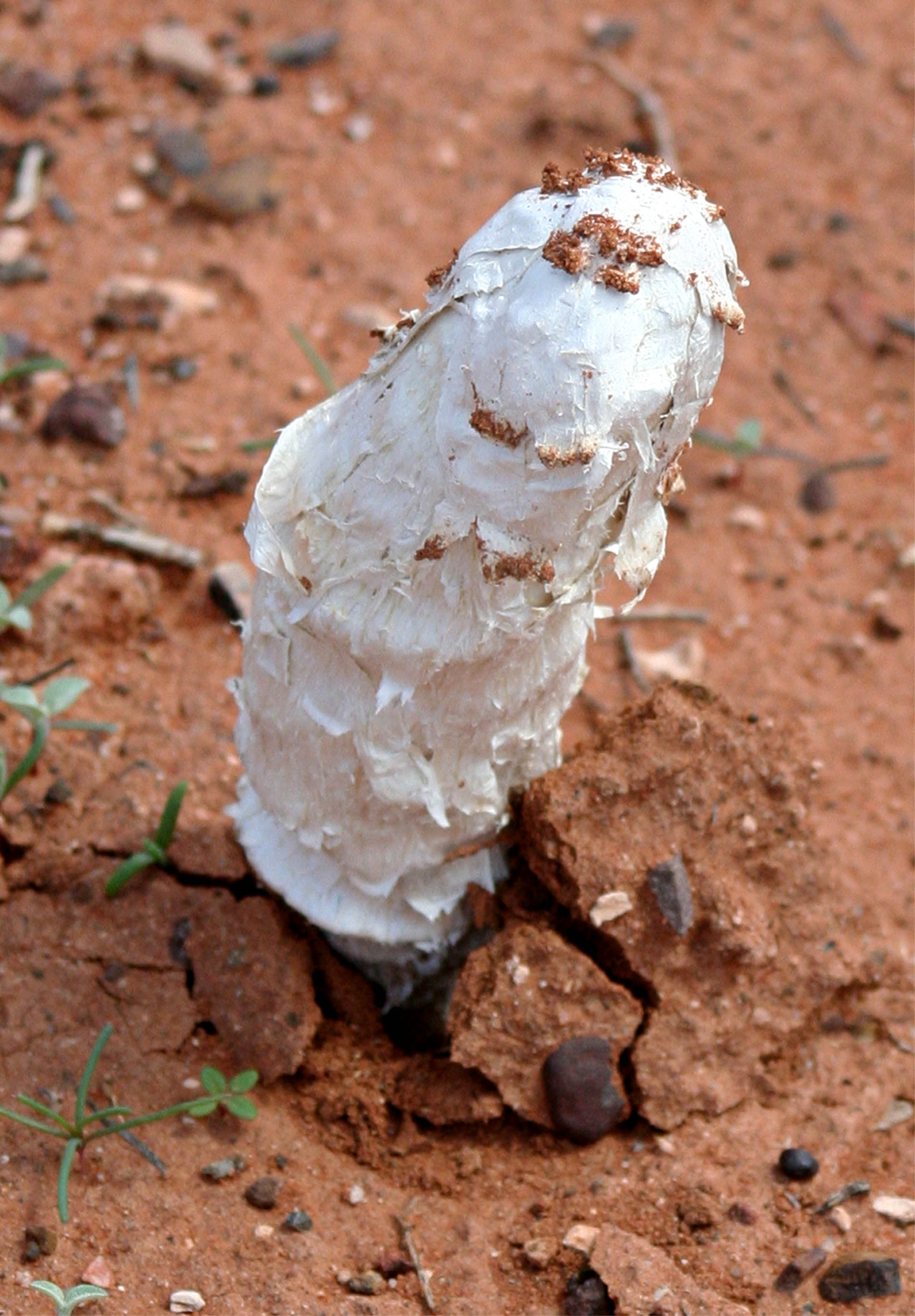
- Phellorinia herculeana

Scientific classification
- Kingdom: Fungi
- Division: Basidiomycota
- Class: Agaricomycetes
- Order: Agaricales
- Family: Phelloriniaceae; Ulbr. (1951)

Type genus
- Phellorinia Berk. (1843)

Genera
- Dictyocephalos; Phellorinia

= Phelloriniaceae =

Family of fungi

The Phelloriniaceae are a family of fungi in the order Agaricales. The family contains two monotypic genera, Dictyocephalos and Phellorinia. The family was circumscribed by the German botanist Oskar Eberhard Ulbrich in 1951.

== See also ==
- List of Agaricales families
