= Phaeotrichum =

Scientific classification
- Kingdom: Fungi
- Division: Ascomycota
- Class: Dothideomycetes
- Family: Phaeotrichaceae
- Genus: Phaeotrichum; Cain & M.E. Barr

Type species
- Phaeotrichum hystricinum Cain & M.E. Barr

Genus of fungi

Phaeotrichum is a genus of fungi in the family Phaeotrichaceae.
