= Delitschiaceae =

Scientific classification
- Kingdom: Fungi
- Division: Ascomycota
- Class: Dothideomycetes
- Order: Pleosporales
- Family: Delitschiaceae; M.E. Barr (2000)

Type genus
- Delitschia Auersw.

Family of fungi

The Delitschiaceae are a family of fungi in the order Pleosporales. Taxa are widespread, especially in temperate regions, and are saprobic, often found growing in herbivore dung.

== Genera ==
- Delitschia (with 69 species)
- Ohleriella (with 2 species)
- Semidelitschia (with 3 species)
