= Diploschistes albopruinosus =

Scientific classification
- Kingdom: Fungi
- Division: Ascomycota
- Class: Lecanoromycetes
- Order: Graphidales
- Family: Graphidaceae
- Genus: Diploschistes
- Species: D. albopruinosus

Binomial name
- Diploschistes albopruinosus Pérez-Vargas, Hern.-Padr. & Elix (2011)

Species of lichen-forming fungus

Diploschistes albopruinosus is a species of saxicolous (rock-dwelling) crustose lichen in the family Graphidaceae. It was described as a new species in 2011, based on specimens collected from the Caldera de Taburiente National Park on the island of La Palma in the Canary Islands (Spain).
