= Diploschistes microsporus =

Scientific classification
- Domain: Eukaryota
- Kingdom: Fungi
- Division: Ascomycota
- Class: Lecanoromycetes
- Order: Graphidales
- Family: Graphidaceae
- Genus: Diploschistes
- Species: D. microsporus

Binomial name
- Diploschistes microsporus Lumbsch & Elix (2003)

Species of lichen

Diploschistes microsporus is a species of saxicolous (rock-dwelling) crustose lichen in the family Graphidaceae. It is found in Australia. The lichen was formally described as a new species in 2003 by the lichenologists H. Thorsten Lumbsch and John Elix, from specimens collected growing on sun-exposed siliceous rocks in New South Wales. The lichen has a thin thallus measuring up to 0.7 mm thick, and has ascospores that are 10–18 by 8–13 μm.
