= Ohleriella =

Scientific classification
- Kingdom: Fungi
- Division: Ascomycota
- Class: Dothideomycetes
- Order: Pleosporales
- Family: Delitschiaceae
- Genus: Ohleriella; Earle

Type species
- Ohleriella neomexicana Earle

Genus of fungi

Ohleriella is a genus of fungi in the family Delitschiaceae. It has been found in America.

The genus name of Ohleriella is in honour of Heinrich Ohler (1803-1876), who was a German botanist from the Dr. Senckenberg Foundation in Frankfurt.

The genus was circumscribed by Franklin Sumner Earle in Bull. New York Bot. Gard. vol.2 on page 349 in 1902.

== Species ==
As accepted by GBIF;

- Ohleriella neomexicana Earle
- Ohleriella nudilignae M.E.Barr & Malloch

Former species; O. herculea (Ellis & Everh.) M.E. Barr (1990) = Sporormiella herculea, Sporormiaceae
