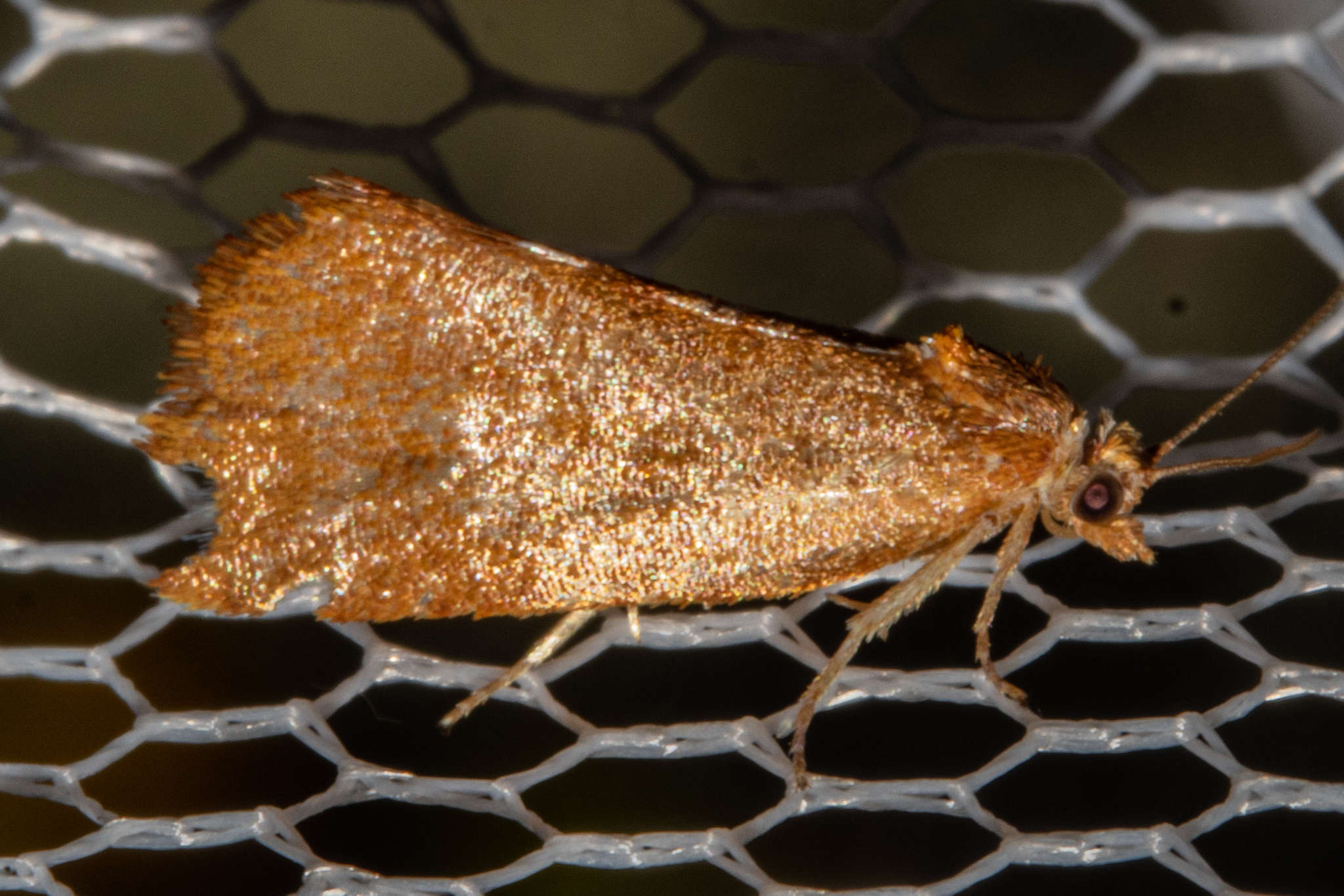

Scientific classification
- Kingdom: Animalia
- Phylum: Arthropoda
- Clade: Pancrustacea
- Class: Insecta
- Order: Lepidoptera
- Family: Tortricidae
- Genus: Pyrgotis
- Species: P. pyramidias

Binomial name
- Pyrgotis pyramidias Meyrick, 1901

= Pyrgotis pyramidias =

Species of moth endemic to New Zealand

Pyrgotis pyramidias is a species of moth in the family Tortricidae. It is endemic to New Zealand. It is classified as "At Risk, Naturally Uncommon" by the Department of Conservation. This species is regarded as having two 'forms' although doubt has been expressed whether these are the same species.

== Taxonomy ==
P. pyramidias was first described by Edward Meyrick in 1901 from a specimen collected by Alfred Philpott in Invercargill. George Hudson described and illustrated this species in his 1928 book The Butterflies and Moths of New Zealand. In 1971 John S. Dugdale confirmed the placement of this species in the genus Pyrgotis. The holotype specimen is held at the Natural History Museum, London. The holotype represents P. pyramidias sensu stricto.

== Description ==
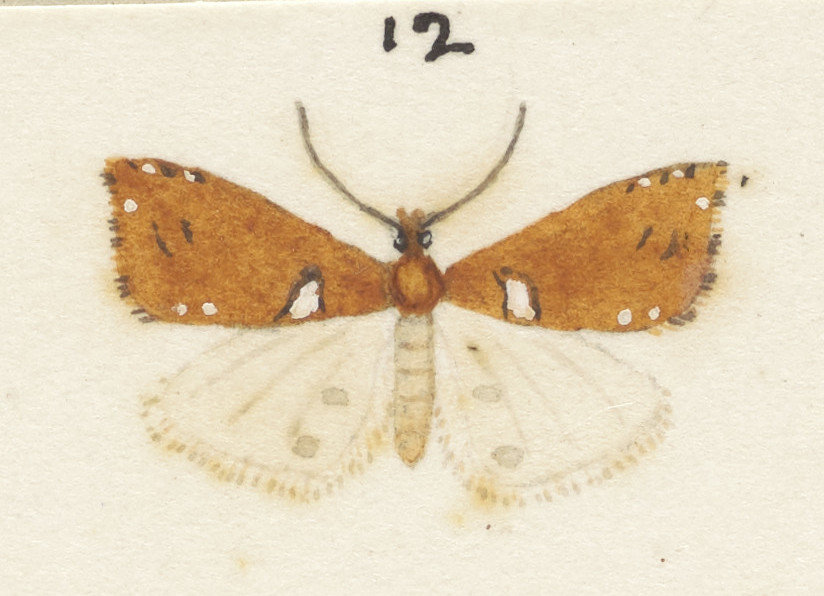
Illustration of P. pyramidias by George Hudson.

Meyrick originally described the species as follows:

♂︎. 16 m.m. Head orange. Palpi ochreous mixed with dark fuscous. Thorax orange-ochreous. Forewings rather elongate-triangnlar, costa moderately arched, apex round-pointed, prominent, termen oblique, rather sharply concave on upper half, prominent in middle; reddish-ochreous, sprinkled with dark crimson, suffusedly irrorated with whitish except towards base and dorsal spot; a sharp white triangular dorsal spot before middle, reaching nearly half across wing, anterior side shortest, enclosing two dark reddish-fuscous dorsal dots : cilia reddish-ochreous, with dark reddish median line, basal half whitish-mixed. Hindwings whitish-grey, becoming whitish towards costa, greyer terminally; cilia whitish, with grey basal line.

The holotype specimen described above is typical of the species from the type locality in that it has a drab appearance and is smaller than the form of the species existing in silver beech forest. The adults of this latter form are more brightly coloured and patterned. Doubt has been expressed whether this larger, more colourful form is the same species as the smaller, more drab form of this moth.

== Distribution ==
This species is endemic to New Zealand. It is found from the Bay of Plenty to Southland. The type locality is around Awarua Bog and Tiwai Point and this is where the smaller, more drab form of the species lives. This form has also been found at Whakarewarewa in Rotorua. The more colourful and patterned form of this species is found in the above stated range where its host plant is present.

== Biology and life cycle ==
This species is on the wing between October and February.

== Host plants and habitat ==
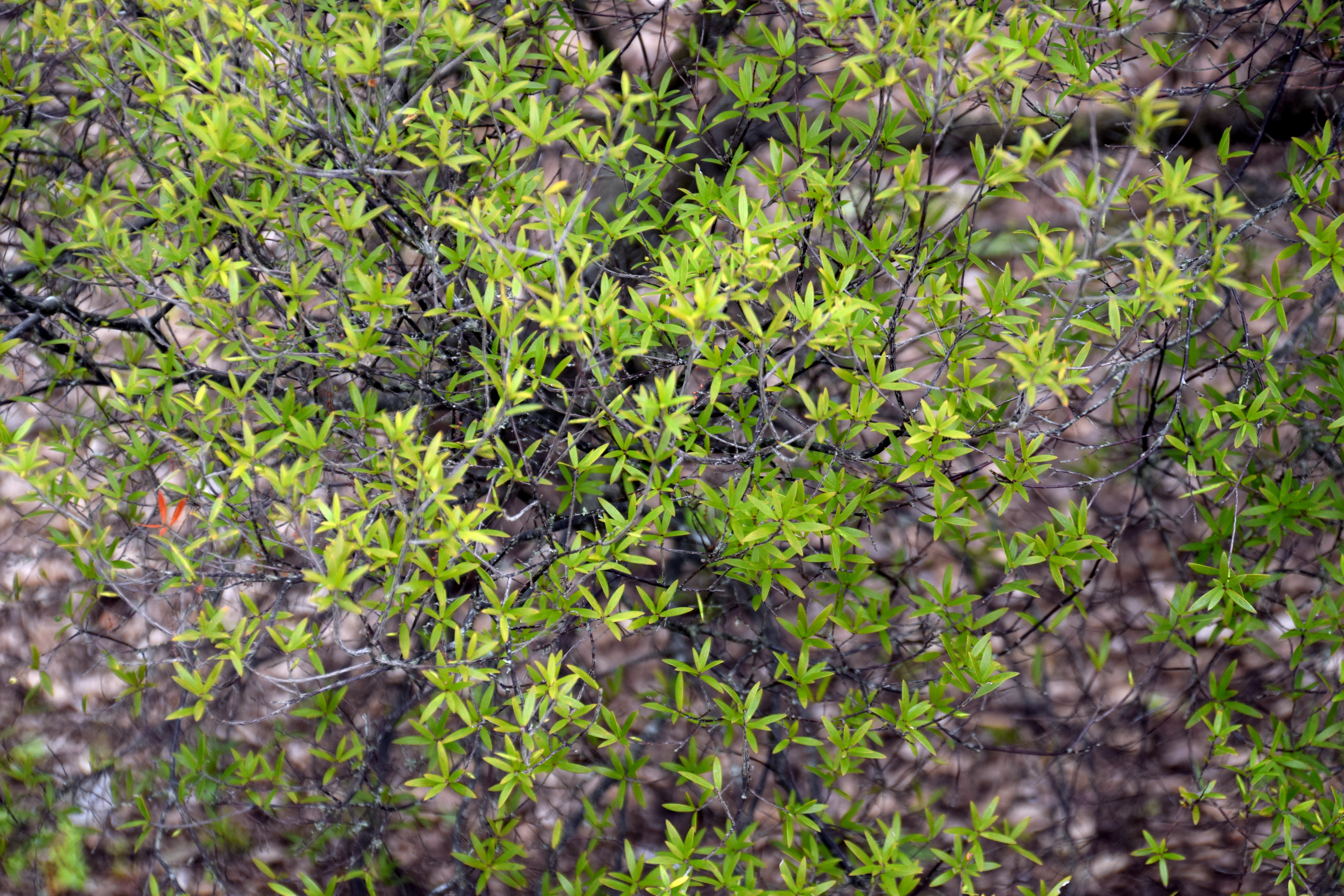
Host plant Leucopogon fasciculatus

The host plant of the larvae of P. pyramidia in the type locality and the above-mentioned population in Rotorua is Leucopogon fasciculatus. The larger, more colourful and patterned form of this species has larvae that feed on Lophozonia menziesii. This host plant is absent from Invercargill and its surrounding area.

== Conservation status ==
P. pyramidia s.s. has been classified as having the "At Risk, Naturally Uncommon" conservation status under the New Zealand Threat Classification System.
