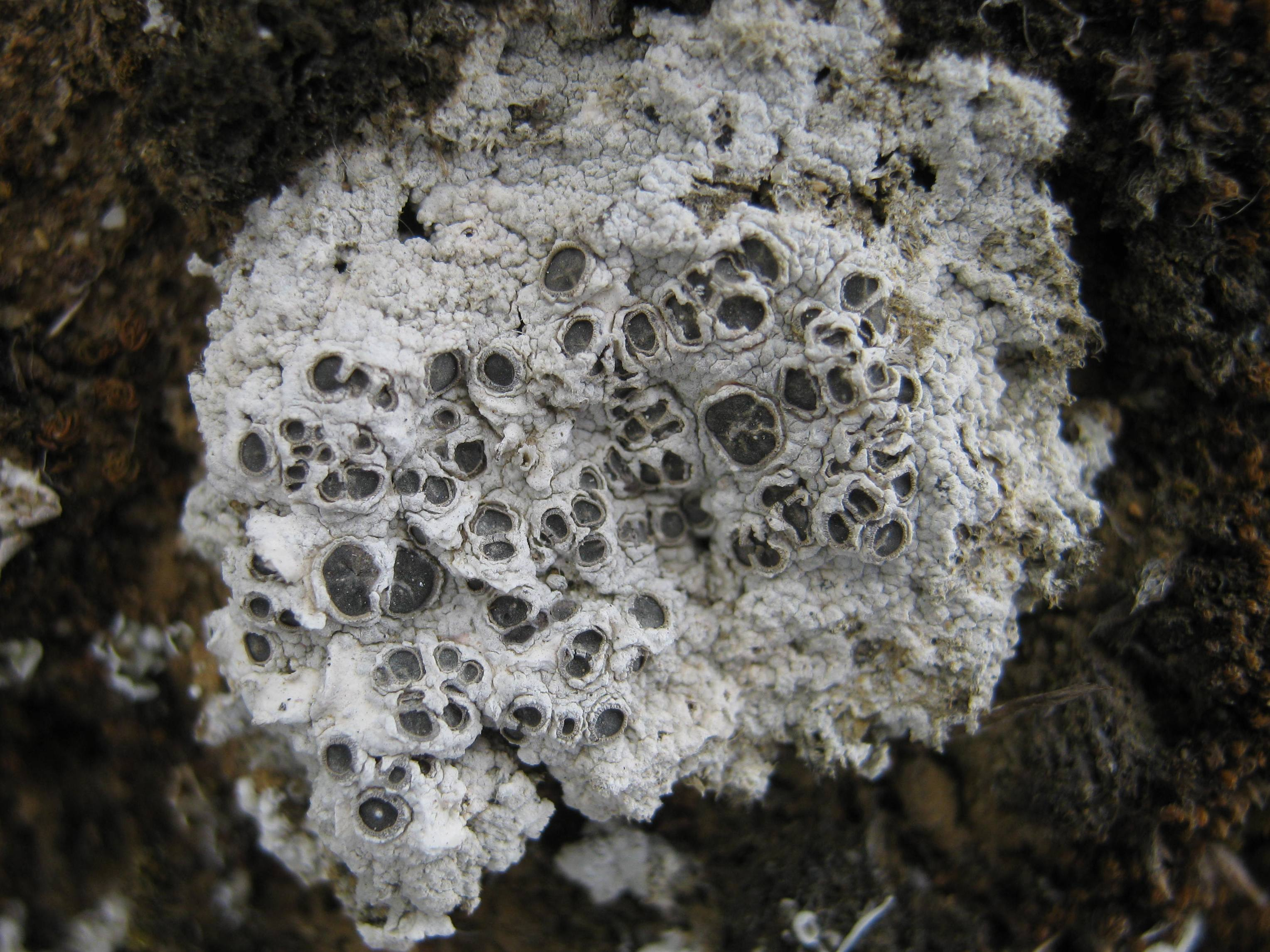

Scientific classification
- Kingdom: Fungi
- Division: Ascomycota
- Class: Lecanoromycetes
- Order: Graphidales
- Family: Graphidaceae
- Genus: Diploschistes
- Species: D. diacapsis

Binomial name
- Diploschistes diacapsis (Ach.) Lumbsch (1988)

Synonyms
- List: Urceolaria diacapsis Ach. (1810); Parmelia scruposa var. diacapsis (Ach.) Fr. (1831); Urceolaria scruposa var. diacapsis (Ach.) Nyl. (1850); Lecanora scruposa var. diacapsis (Ach.) Nyl. (1854); Urceolaria interpediens Nyl. (1880); Diploschistes interpediens (Nyl.) Zahlbr. (1892); Urceolaria scruposa var. interpediens (Nyl.) Boistel (1903); Diploschistes gypsaceus subsp. interpediens (Nyl.) Clauzade & Cl.Roux (1985); Diploschistes diacapsis subsp. interpediens (Nyl.) Clauzade & Cl.Roux (1989); Diploschistes diacapsis subsp. interpediens (Nyl.) Cl.Roux (2006); Diploschistes neutrophilus (Clauzade & Cl.Roux) Fdez.-Brime & Llimona (2013)

= Diploschistes diacapsis =

Species of lichen-forming fungus

Diploschistes diacapsis (also called the desert crater lichen) is a ground-dwelling crustose lichen in the family Graphidaceae. It forms a thick, pale grey to greyish-white crust that cracks into small patches. Its fruiting bodies (apothecia) are sunken and often dusted with a powdery coating (pruina), and it produces brown, muriform (multichambered) ascospores. The lichen body (thallus) contains lecanoric and diploschistesic acids. The species typically grows in arid and semi-arid regions on calcium-rich or gypsum soils, where it can form extensive pale carpets within biological soil crusts (surface communities of lichens, mosses, and microbes that bind soil). It is distinguished from similar soil-dwelling species by its thick, heavily pruinose thallus, eight-spored asci (spore sacs), and distinctive chemistry.

The species is most often reported from open, exposed habitats on calcareous (lime-rich) or gypsiferous (gypsum-rich) soils, where it can be a conspicuous component of biological soil crusts. It has been recorded across arid and semi-arid regions of North America and around the Mediterranean basin, with additional reports from Macaronesia, Eurasia, and northern Africa. Studies in south-east Spain and other dryland regions have examined its ecophysiology, its effects on runoff and erosion in soil crusts, and its interactions with lichenicolous (lichen-dwelling) lichens. In these environments, the lichen can influence water infiltration (how quickly water soaks into soil) and erosion, and its thick crusts may affect the germination and establishment of certain plant species.

== Taxonomy ==
The name Diploschistes diacapsis is based on Urceolaria diacapsis, described by Erik Acharius in 1810 from material collected on rocks and walls in England and Spain. In the original description, Acharius characterised it as a chalky white, finely cracked crust with immersed (sunken), urn-shaped apothecia whose black disc is dusted with a white, powdery coating and surrounded by a thick, inrolled rim (proper margin); he compared it with Urceolaria gypsacea and remarked that the almost free, inrolled margin gives it some resemblance to Gyalecta. Lumbsch transferred Acharius's species to Diploschistes in 1988, publishing the new combination Diploschistes diacapsis. To clarify which specimen the name refers to, he selected Lagasca's Spanish collection as the lectotype (with an isolectotype in H-ACH). Acharius had cited two original specimens, but Harriman's material belongs to an Aspicilia species rather than to Diploschistes. With that typification, he treated D. diacapsis as the correct name for the soil-dwelling taxon that had often been called D. steppicus.

Molecular phylogenetic studies place Diploschistes within Graphidaceae and suggest the genus is most diverse in arid and semi-arid regions, with species growing on rock, soil, or over mosses and other lichens. The genus is traditionally characterised by a blackened rim of tissue around the fruiting body (a carbonised excipulum), sterile filaments alongside the spore-bearing structures (paraphyses), a Trebouxia algal partner (photobiont), and the absence of a central column (columella). Three main fruiting-body forms have been described: perithecioid (flask-like), urceolate (urn-shaped), and lecanoroid (open, disc-like). In that study, Fernández-Brime et al. placed D. diacapsis in Diploschistes subgenus Diploschistes (the "Scruposus group"). In their analyses, material identified as D. diacapsis fell into two distantly related clades (separate branches of the evolutionary tree). One clade was associated with thick thalli that become convex and loosely attached on gypsiferous and strongly calcareous inland soils. The other was associated with thinner, flatter thalli tightly attached to coastal soils, corresponding to material previously treated as D. diacapsis subsp. neutrophilus; on that basis, they supported recognising the coastal taxon at species rank as Diploschistes neutrophilus.

In a later six-locus study with broader sampling, specimens matching the two morphologies did not form separate clades (including inland records identified as D. neutrophilus). Thallus thickness and shape were treated as inconsistent characters in this group and the authors treated D. neutrophilus as a synonym of D. diacapsis; species-delimitation analyses (tests of whether the two names represent separate species) also supported collapsing the two names. In an ITS-based phylogeny (using the internal transcribed spacer DNA region) assembled for selected Diploschistes taxa, sequences identified as D. diacapsis grouped with D. neutrophilus, D. scruposus, and D. gypsaceus in a clade reported as having strong support in that analysis.

The common name "crater lichen" applies to the genus Diploschistes; the name "desert crater lichen" is used for this species.

== Description ==
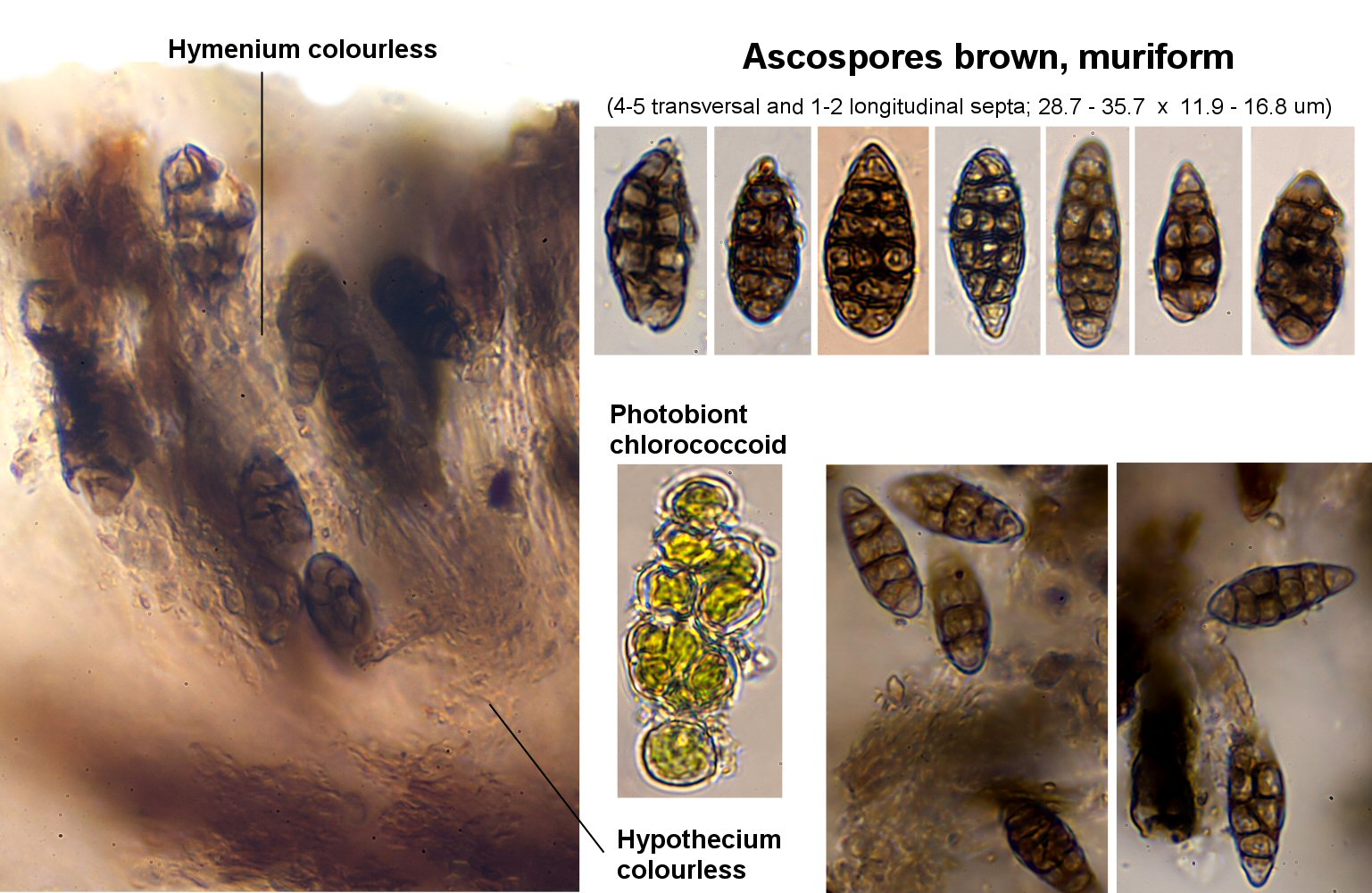
Microscopic views of D. diacapsis, showing the spore-bearing layer, green algal cells (the photobiont), and brown, muriform (multi-septate) ascospores.

Diploschistes diacapsis is a soil-dwelling crustose lichen that forms a greyish to greyish-white crust broken by fine cracks into small, irregular areoles (patches). In the Greater Sonoran Desert flora, the thallus is described as cracked (rimose) and sometimes warty, forming areoles 0.5–2.5 mm wide and a rough, dull, whitish to whitish-grey upper surface that may be scarcely to abundantly pruinose (powder-dusted). The apothecia are urceolate, sessile, and up to 2.5 mm in diameter, with a concave, blackish disc. The thallus is often very thick and heavily pruinose, giving it a pale grey, sometimes slightly undulating appearance, and it may form patches more than 5 cm across; the areoles may reach about 2.5 mm in diameter, and rhizines (root-like anchoring structures) are absent. The photobiont (photosynthetic algal partner) is a green alga of the Trebouxia type. The apothecia are usually urn-shaped (urceolate), sometimes becoming more open, about 2–5 mm across, and may also be pruinose; the proper rim is brown and built of tightly packed tissue.

Under the microscope, the hymenium (spore-bearing layer) is about 110–180 μm tall, with simple paraphyses 1–2 μm thick. The asci are subclavate to cylindrical (about 100–140 × 20–28 μm) and contain 4–8 spores. Ascospores are brown and muriform (divided into many compartments), typically 20–40 × 9–17 μm, with 3–6 transverse and 1–2 longitudinal septa. Asexual spores are produced in immersed (sunken) pycnidia; the conidia are bacilliform (rod-shaped), about 4–6 × 1.0–1.5 μm. D. diacapsis contains lecanoric acid and diploschistesic acid. In standard spot tests the thallus is K+ (yellow turning red) and C+ (red), and PD−. D. diacapsis contains diploschistesic and lecanoric acids as major components and orsellinic acid as a minor constituent.

In gypsum soil-crust systems in central Spain, D. diacapsis has been reported to contain more than one Trebouxia photobiont lineage within a single thallus (more than one algal strain in the same lichen body) and to provide photobiont cells to some lichenicolous lichens, whose thalli either retain the host's microalgae or switch to different algal partners. On calcarenite (a carbonate-rich rock) in south-east Spain, Souza-Egipsy and colleagues reported that much of the thallus consists of fungal tissue mixed with fine mineral fragments incorporated during growth, and that calcium oxalate minerals occur within the thallus and were characterised using Raman spectroscopy.

=== Similar species ===
Diploschistes diacapsis can resemble Diploschistes muscorum, but that species is described as typically lacking pruina (the powdery coating) and being smaller and flatter with a thinner thallus, and it is reported mainly from non-calcareous soils. The lookalike, which begins life as a parasite on Cladonia species, also differs from D. diacapsis in having four-spored asci (spore sacs) rather than eight-spored asci. The Sonoran Desert flora treats North American reports of Diploschistes ocellatus as misidentifications of D. diacapsis, stating that D. ocellatus does not occur in the Western Hemisphere; it is distinguished by lecanoroid ascomata (more open, disc-like fruiting bodies) and the presence of norstictic acid.

== Habitat and distribution ==
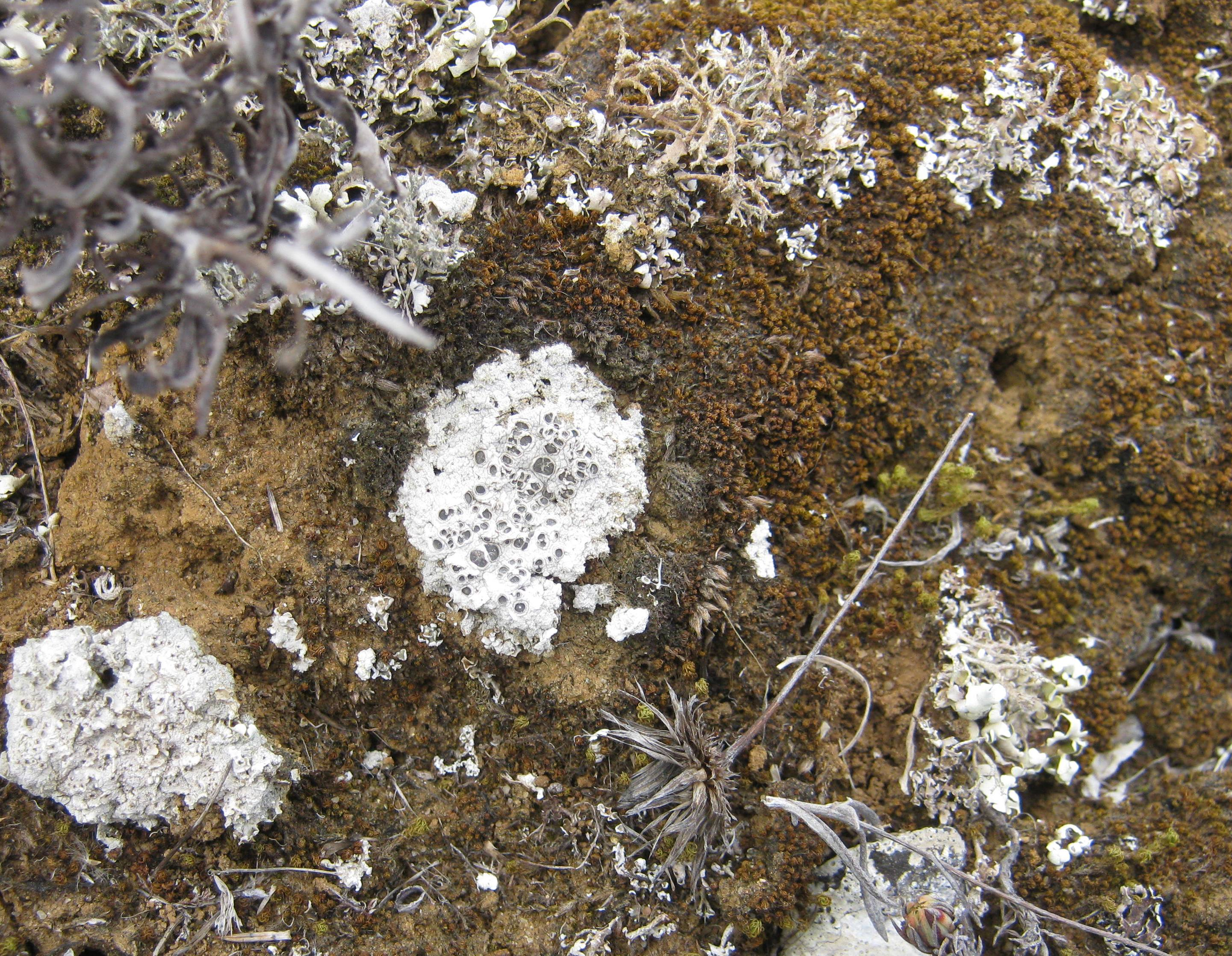
Thalli of Diploschistes diacapsis forming a pale, cracked soil crust with black, pruinose apothecia, Planalto das Cezaredas, Portugal

Diploschistes diacapsis is a soil-dwelling crustose lichen of open, exposed habitats, reported chiefly from calcareous (lime-rich) soils and also from gypsum-rich ground. Lumbsch characterised its overall range as "northern xeric" (dry regions of the Northern Hemisphere) and listed collections from the United States, Mexico, Macaronesia, Eurasia, and northern Africa; in Europe, he reported its northern limit as southern Switzerland. In western North America it is reported as common on gypsiferous soils in cool-desert regions, including coastal Sonora and southern California grasslands and chaparral, and it has also been reported from a wider range of soils farther south and east. In the Greater Sonoran Desert Region, D. diacapsis is described as common in semi-arid exposed habitats and coastal areas at 5–250 m and up to about 800 m in Baja California and southern California. It is also reported from higher elevations, occurring in open bushlands or open pine forests at about 1,600–1,800 m in Arizona and Chihuahua; the same flora describes its world distribution as nearly cosmopolitan (widespread, but not truly worldwide) in open habitats with Mediterranean to arid climates.

Across multiple site reports, the species appears regularly in biological soil crusts in dry Mediterranean and steppe (semi-arid grassland) settings. In southern Tunisia it is reported as a dominant lichen in soil crusts of Stipa tenacissima steppe on alkaline sandy-loam soils with caliche layers and gypsum outcrops. In central Spain, it is among the characteristic crustose lichens of gypsum soil crusts and has been described there as a preferential gypsophyte (a species associated mainly with gypsum soils), though also reported from other substrates. Spanish locality records include Triassic gypsum at Gobantes-Meliones in Málaga Province (about 600 m elevation), where mean annual precipitation was reported as 427.9 mm (1965–1988), with about 64 precipitation days per year, and calcarenite at Cerro de Enmedio (Cabo de Gata-Níjar Natural Park, Almería).

== Ecology ==
In the Tabernas badlands of south-east Spain, slope aspect (the direction a slope faces) creates strong contrasts in microclimate and vegetation, and D. diacapsis is reported mainly from north-facing slopes and adjacent flatter pediments (gently sloping surfaces at the foot of hills). There it may form extensive whitish carpets that have been associated with reduced erosion and with the development of plant patches, whereas the sunnier south-facing slopes are more eroded and commonly support little vegetation. Laboratory measurements were made by comparing thalli from north-facing ("shade") and south-facing ("sun") slopes and measuring CO_{2} exchange under controlled light, temperature, and thallus water content. In these experiments, the sun-exposed population generally showed higher net photosynthesis (more CO_{2} uptake in the light), while measures of photosynthetic efficiency and the light level where photosynthesis balances respiration (the light compensation point) were broadly similar between the two populations. After adjusting the results for dry mass and chlorophyll content, sun thalli still showed higher net photosynthesis. Shade thalli, however, had more lichen biomass per unit area and held more water per unit area, a pattern interpreted as supporting longer hydrated (active) periods in shadier microhabitats; they summarised this as a trade-off between higher photosynthetic rates during shorter active periods on south-facing slopes and longer active periods with lower rates on north-facing slopes. Studies of continuous lichen-dominated soil crusts describe rapid ponding (water pooling on the surface) and runoff, reducing water infiltration into the soil, while still producing lower sediment loss than bare ground. Souza-Egipsy and colleagues investigated this pattern in D. diacapsis using scanning electron microscopy, and suggested that infiltration depends largely on breaks in the crust (such as microfissures) rather than on the crust alone.

In a growth-chamber experiment using the steppe grass Macrochloa tenacissima, soil covered by a D. diacapsis crust delayed germination and reduced mean germination (the average proportion of seeds that germinated) compared with bare soil: first germination occurred after 22 days (vs 16 days on bare soil) and mean germination was 9% (vs 18%). Seedlings that germinated were less likely to emerge above the surface and their roots were less likely to penetrate into the soil, while seed viability was similar across treatments (85–90%). Possible contributors included reduced water availability where the crust seals the surface, physical resistance from a thick, continuous thallus, and species-specific exudates (released compounds).

On gypsum biological soil crusts of the Iberian Peninsula, D. diacapsis can act as a substrate for other lichen-forming fungi: Acarospora species may begin as parasites on D. diacapsis and later develop independent thalli, and Rhizocarpon malenconianum has been described as an obligate lichenicolous lichen on it (restricted to growing on other lichens); Diplotomma rivas-martinezii is also reported to occur close to D. diacapsis in the same crust communities. Where it grows on exposed gypsum bedrock, thalli can shield the substrate beneath them from direct rainfall, while adjacent unprotected gypsum continues to dissolve and lower in surface level; this contrast can produce small conical or rounded gypsum mounds associated with the lichens, up to about 15 mm high, which Mottershead and Lucas described as an "umbrella effect". On calcarenite in south-east Spain, D. diacapsis has been reported to break down the rock by weathering the carbonate cement that binds mineral fragments, with hyphae (fungal filaments) growing between carbonate fragments, quartz grains, and mica within the substratum; the same study noted that little or no growth of other microorganisms occurred immediately adjacent to the crustose thallus, in contrast to the more microbially diverse communities observed beneath foliose (leaf-like) lichens at the same site.

In the Colorado Plateau region it has been described as a good field indicator of gypsum-rich soils and may form large populations that locally dominate soil-crust communities, often reported with Psora decipiens, Gyalolechia bracteata, and Squamarina lentigera.
