= Echinoascotheca =

Scientific classification
- Kingdom: Fungi
- Division: Ascomycota
- Class: Dothideomycetes
- Family: Phaeotrichaceae
- Genus: Echinoascotheca; Matsush.

Type species
- Echinoascotheca duplooformis Matsush.

Genus of fungi

Echinoascotheca is a genus of fungi in the family Phaeotrichaceae. This is a monotypic genus, containing the single species Echinoascotheca duplooformis.
