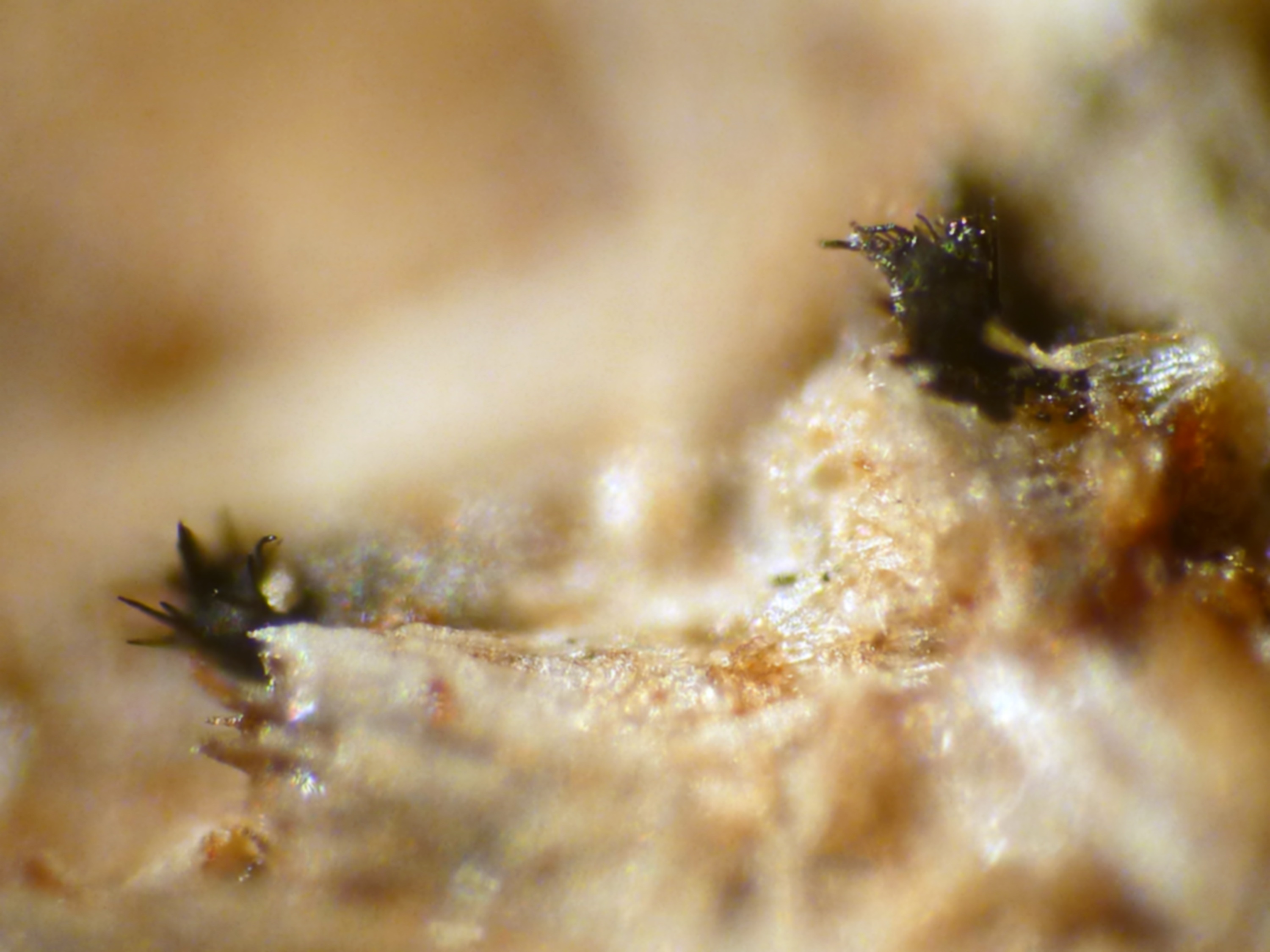
- Trichoditschia bisporula

Scientific classification
- Kingdom: Fungi
- Division: Ascomycota
- Class: Dothideomycetes
- Family: Phaeotrichaceae
- Genus: Trichodelitschia; Munk

Type species
- Trichodelitschia bisporula (P. Crouan & H. Crouan) Munk

= Trichodelitschia =

Genus of fungi

Trichodelitschia is a genus of fungi in the family Phaeotrichaceae.
