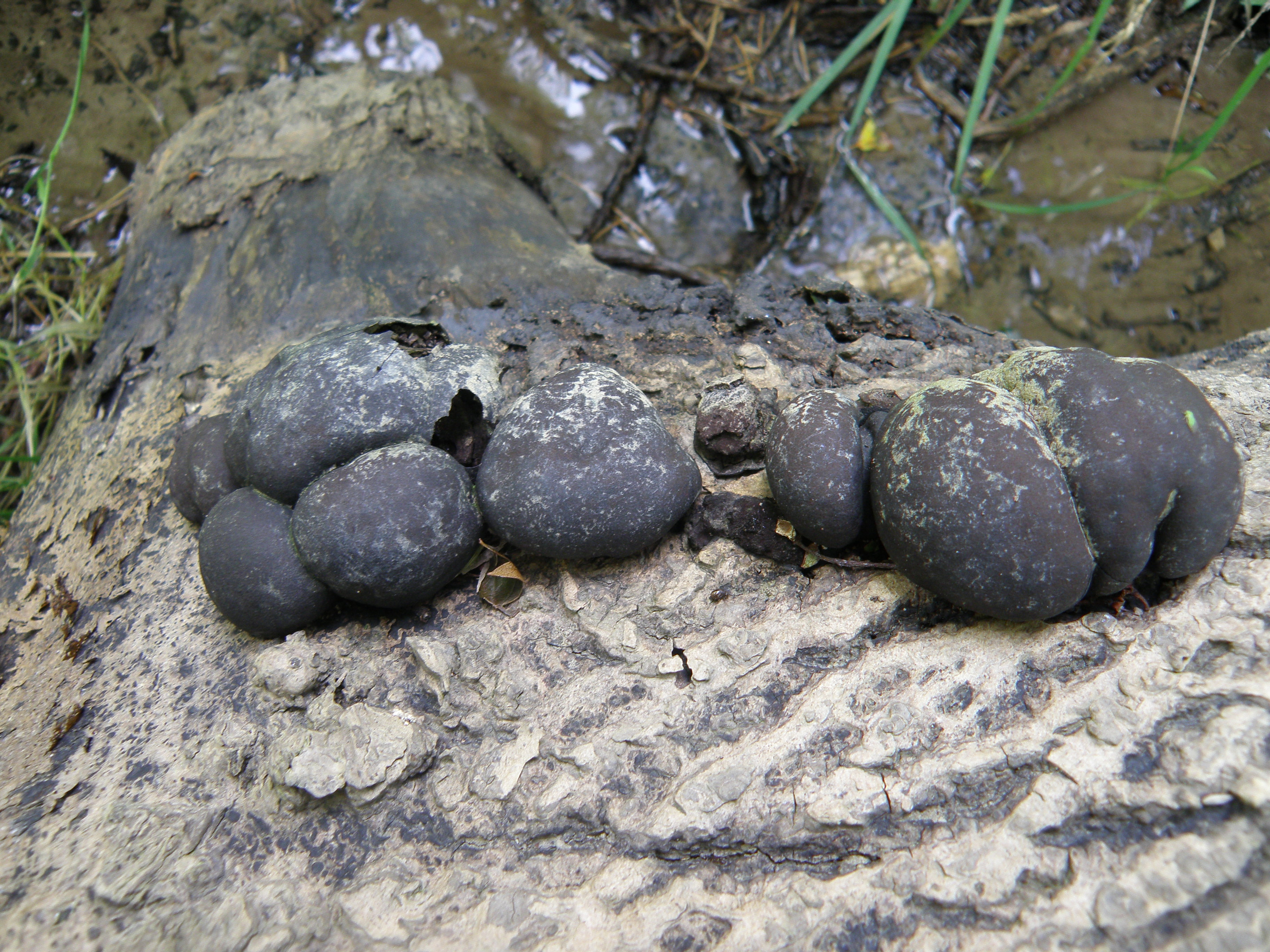

Scientific classification
- Kingdom: Fungi
- Division: Ascomycota
- Class: Sordariomycetes
- Order: Xylariales
- Family: Hypoxylaceae
- Genus: Daldinia
- Species: D. concentrica

Binomial name
- Daldinia concentrica (Bolton) Cesati & de Notaris

= Daldinia concentrica =

Species of fungus

Daldinia concentrica
- Mycological characteristics
- Glebal hymenium
- No distinct cap
- Hymenium attachment is not applicable
- Lacks a stipe
- Spore print is black
- Ecology is saprotrophic
- Edibility is inedible

The inedible fungus Daldinia concentrica is known by several common names, including King Alfred's cake, cramp balls, and coal fungus. It is a common, widespread saprotrophic sac fungus, living on dead and decaying wood.

The fruit of this fungus is hemi-spherical, with a hard, friable, shiny black fruiting body 2 to 7 centimeters wide. It resembles a chunk of coal, which gives it several of its common names, including coal fungus and carbon balls. According to legend, King Alfred once hid out in a countryside homestead during war, and was put in charge of removing baking from the oven when it was done. He fell asleep and the cakes burned. Daldinia concentrica is said to resemble a cake left to this fate.

The flesh of the fruit body is purple, brown, or silvery-black inside, and is arranged in concentric layers. Most sources agree that like tree rings, these layers are related to seasonal growth. The asci are cylindrical and arranged inside the flask-shaped perithecium. When each ascus becomes engorged with fluid it extends outside the perithecium and releases spores.

D. concentrica contains several unique compounds, including a purple polycyclic pigment and a metabolite called concentricol, which is oxidized squalene. Many types of insects and other small animals make their home inside this species of fungus.

== Uses ==
The fungus is a useful form of tinder for fire-lighting. The brown variety is usually too heavy and dense to be much good; the black variety is lighter and better. It does need to be completely dry, whereupon it will take a spark from traditional flint and steel. It burns slowly, much like a charcoal briquette, with a particularly pungent smoke. Once lit it usually requires constant oxygen flow to keep burning, such as through swinging the fungus or blowing on it. Fragments can be broken off to expose more embers and transferred to a tinder bundle to create an open flame.

== Ecological value ==
Caterpillars of the concealer moth Harpella forficella have been found to eat this fungus.

This fungus plays a pivotal role in accelerating the decomposition of the fallen branches of ash trees, which are naturally dropped very frequently.
