= Dictyocephalos =

Scientific classification
- Kingdom: Fungi
- Division: Basidiomycota
- Class: Agaricomycetes
- Order: Agaricales
- Family: Phelloriniaceae
- Genus: Dictyocephalos; Underw. ex V.S. White

Type species
- Dictyocephalos attenuatus Underw.

Synonyms
- Battarreopsis Henn. Whetstonia Lloyd

Genus of fungi

Dictyocephalos is a genus of fungi in the family Phelloriniaceae of the order Agaricales. The genus is monotypic, and contains the single species Dictyocephalos attenuatus, commonly known as the stalked oddball, which was described by the American botanist Lucien Marcus Underwood in 1901 (as D. curvatus).

Dictyocephalos attenuatus is a unique species of mushroom, as it has a gleba like a puffball, but it also has a stipe and a volva, like an Amanita. Starting as an underground "egg", the spore case develops up to 13 cm (5 in) across, round and slightly gelatinous at first then flattens and develops brownish scales. This is situated on the white-to-brownish enlarged end of the stem, which can grow up to 40 centimetres (16 in) long. It is inedible.
