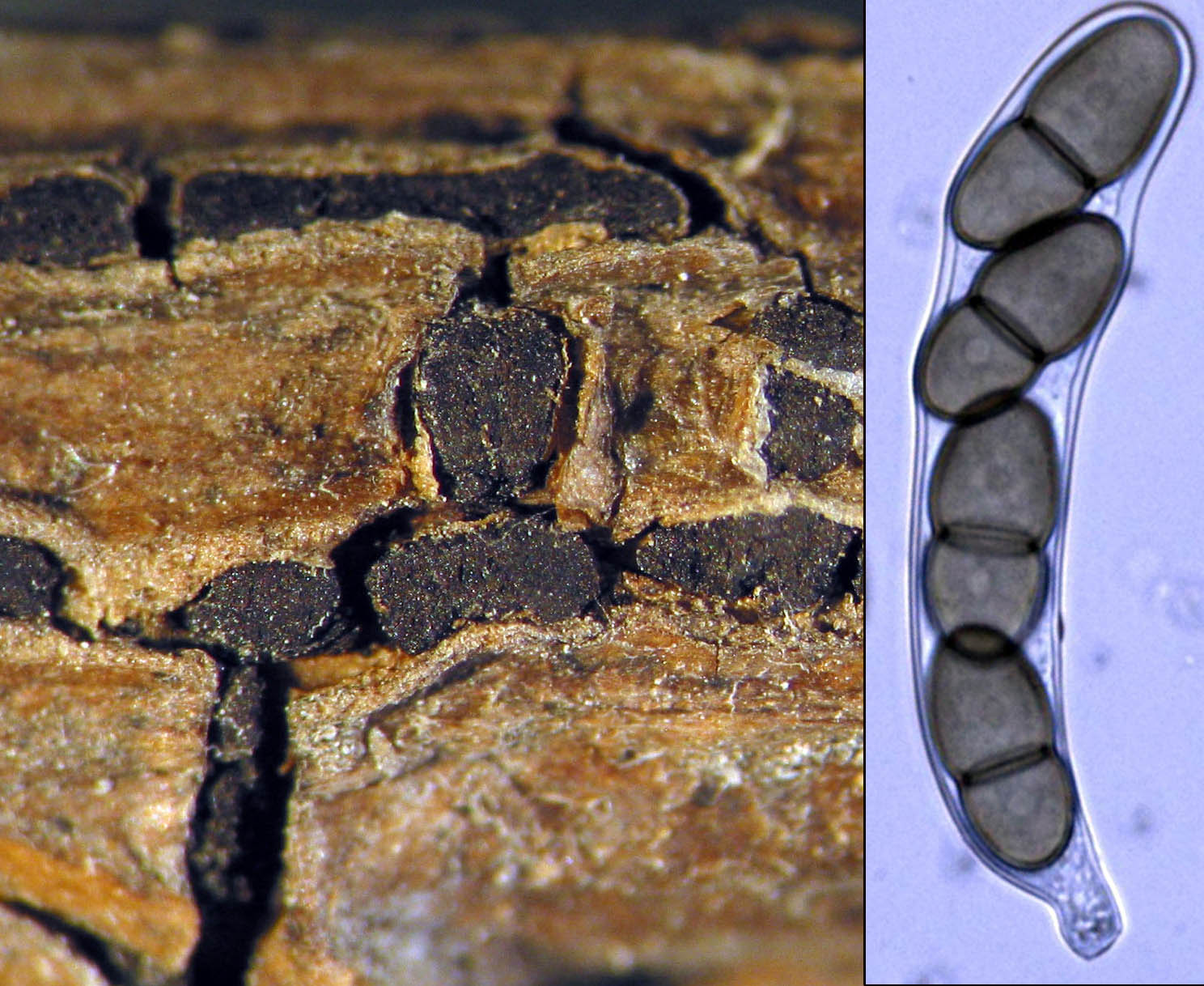
- Dothidea puccinioides, stroma and bitunicate ascus

Scientific classification
- Kingdom: Fungi
- Division: Ascomycota
- Class: Dothideomycetes
- Order: Dothideales
- Family: Dothideaceae; Chevall. (1826)

Type genus
- Dothidea Fr. (1818)

= Dothideaceae =

Family of fungi

The Dothideaceae are a family of fungi in the order Dothideales. Species in this family have a widespread distribution, especially in tropical areas.

== Genera ==
As accepted by Species Fungorum;

- Bagnisiella - 31 spp. (placement uncertain)
- Dictyodothis - 8 spp.
- Dothidea - 28 spp.
- Hyalocrea - 2 spp. (may not be in family)
- Omphalospora - 4 spp.
- Pachysacca - 3 spp.
- Phyllachorella - 2 spp. (placement uncertain)
- Scirrhia - 23 spp.
- Stylodothis - 3spp.
- Vestergrenia - 24 spp.
