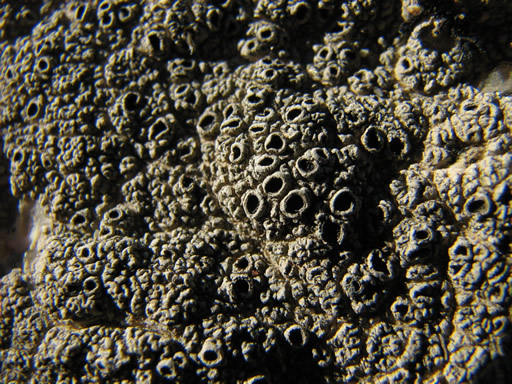
- Diploschistes scruposus

Scientific classification
- Domain: Eukaryota
- Kingdom: Fungi
- Division: Ascomycota
- Class: Lecanoromycetes
- Order: Graphidales
- Family: Graphidaceae
- Genus: Diploschistes; Norman (1853)

Type species
- Diploschistes scruposus (Schreb.) Norman (1853)

Species
- ~43

Synonyms
- Lectularia Stirt. (1878); Lagerheimina Kuntze (1891); Polyschistes J.Steiner (1898); Protoschistes M.Choisy (1928); Urceolariomyces Cif. & Tomas. (1953); Diploschistomyces Werner (1976)

= Diploschistes =

Genus of lichen

Diploschistes is a genus of lichen-forming fungi in the family Graphidaceae. Commonly known as crater lichens, members of the genus are crustose lichens with a thick, cracked (areolate) body (thallus) with worldwide distribution. The fruiting part (apothecia) are immersed in the thick thallus so as to have the appearance of being small "craters". The widespread genus contains about 43 species.

== Taxonomy ==
Johannes Musæus Norman originally circumscribed the genus in 1853. It is in the family Graphidaceae. In 2018, Kraichak and colleagues, using a "temporal phylogenetic" approach to identify temporal bands for specific taxonomic ranks, proposed placing Diploschistes as the type genus of Diploschistaceae, a family originally proposed by Alexander Zahlbruckner in 1905. This taxonomic proposal was rejected by Robert Lücking in a critical 2019 review of the temporal method for the classification of lichen-forming fungi, using this specific example to highlight several drawbacks of this approach.

Early taxonomic studies by H. Thorsten Lumbsch in the 1980s established that the genus contains about 30 species, primarily distributed in arid and semi-arid regions worldwide. Lumbsch divided the genus into three groups based on morphological characteristics: the actinostomus group (species with perithecioid ascomata), the scruposus group (species with urceolate or lecanoroid ascomata), and the ocellatus group (containing only D. ocellatus, which has Lecanora-like ascomata).

A 2003 molecular phylogenetics analysis using nuclear ITS rDNA sequences confirmed that Diploschistes is monophyletic. Their analysis revealed D. ocellatus as a sister group to the remaining Diploschistes species. This molecular evidence contrasted with previous morphological cladistic studies which had suggested an evolutionary trend from perithecioid to urceolate ascomata within the genus. The ITS data instead indicated that perithecioid ascomata are an apomorphic (derived) character, with the actinostomus group forming a monophyletic clade nested within the paraphyletic scruposus group.

The study also found significant genetic distances between D. ocellatus and other Diploschistes species, suggesting it might represent a distinct lineage within Thelotremataceae. Members of the genus can be distinguished by having Trebouxia as a photobiont, a blackish pigmented pseudoparenchymatous true exciple, and lateral paraphyses.

== Description ==
The thallus (lichen body) of Diploschistes species can be continuous or cracked into small, areolate sections. It varies in colour from grey-white to dark grey or yellowish and can have a smooth to warty (verrucose) surface, often covered with a powdery coating (pruinose). The medulla, the inner layer of the thallus, reacts with iodine (I) to turn blue, although this reaction can be variable. The photobiont, or photosynthetic partner, in these lichens is Trebouxia, a type of green algae.

The ascomata (fruiting bodies) start off resembling perithecia (flask-shaped structures) and later become urn-shaped (urceolate) and immersed in the thallus. The disc, or central part, is black and sometimes pruinose. A thalline margin (a rim of thallus tissue around the apothecia) is present and can either blend in with the thallus or be thick and pruinose. The true exciple, a ring of tissue around the apothecia, is fused with the thalline margin and is dark brown to black. It consists of thick-walled, swollen to more or less spherical (globose) cells embedded in a matrix, and extends into pale brown periphysoids at the upper inside margin. These structures are faintly septate and not swollen at the tip, often appearing as a fringe on the surface and may close the ascomatal opening under dry conditions.

The epithecium, the uppermost layer of cells in the apothecia, can be colourless to black and sometimes contains crystalline inclusions. The hymenium, a spore-bearing layer, is colourless and does not react with iodine (I–). The hypothecium, the layer below the hymenium, can be colourless to dark brown or black. The hamathecium, comprising the paraphyses (sterile filaments among the asci), consists of wavy, mostly unbranched filaments that are sparsely septate and sometimes brown at the tips.

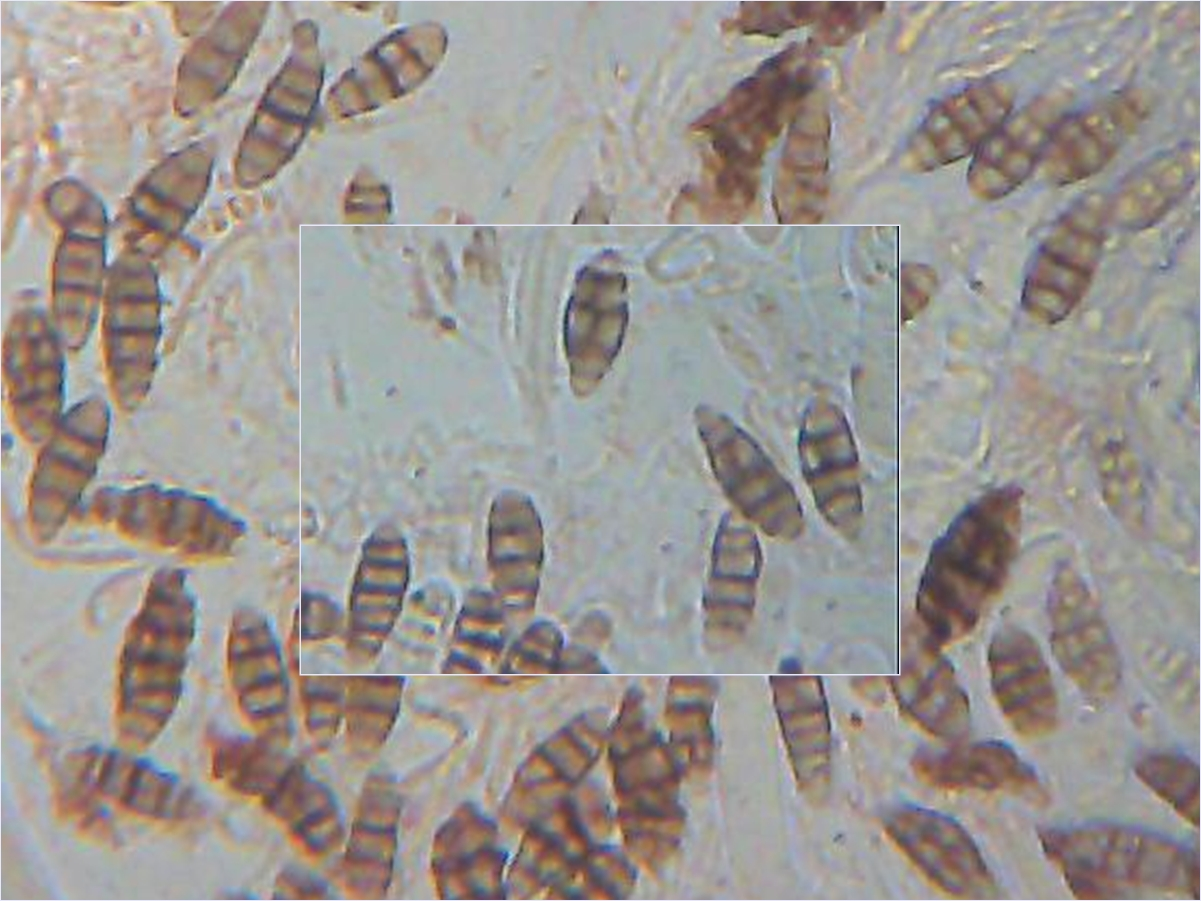
Ascospores of Diploschistes diacapsis

The asci (spore-producing cells) are elongated and club-shaped to somewhat cylindrical, with walls that are evenly thickened at maturity. When young, they have a somewhat abrupt apical thickening with a thin internal apical beak or a downward convex swelling, but lack any apical apparatus. The contents of the asci react with potassium/iodine (K/I) to turn orange-red, while the walls do not react (K/I–). They are not fissitunicate (do not split open at maturity) and contain between one and eight spores. Ascospores are broadly ellipsoidal, brown to dark brown or purple-black when mature, and blue-green when immature. They are muriform (having multiple transverse and longitudinal septa), smooth, and lack a distinct outer layer (perispore). They may react with iodine to turn blue (I± blue).

Conidiomata, which produce asexual spores, are in the form of pycnidia (flask-shaped structures) that appear as slightly raised black warts. The conidiogenous cells, which produce the conidia (asexual spores), are either unbranched or branched at the base and are elongated and flask-shaped. The conidia are bacilliform (rod-shaped) to elongated-ellipsoidal, truncate (flat) to pointed at the base, colourless, and do not have septa.

Diploschistes lichens contain para-depsides, such as lecanoric and diploschistesic acids, which are secondary metabolites (lichen products) that can be identified through chemical tests.

== Species ==
As of July 2024, Species Fungorum (in the Catalogue of Life) accepts 27 species of Diploschistes:

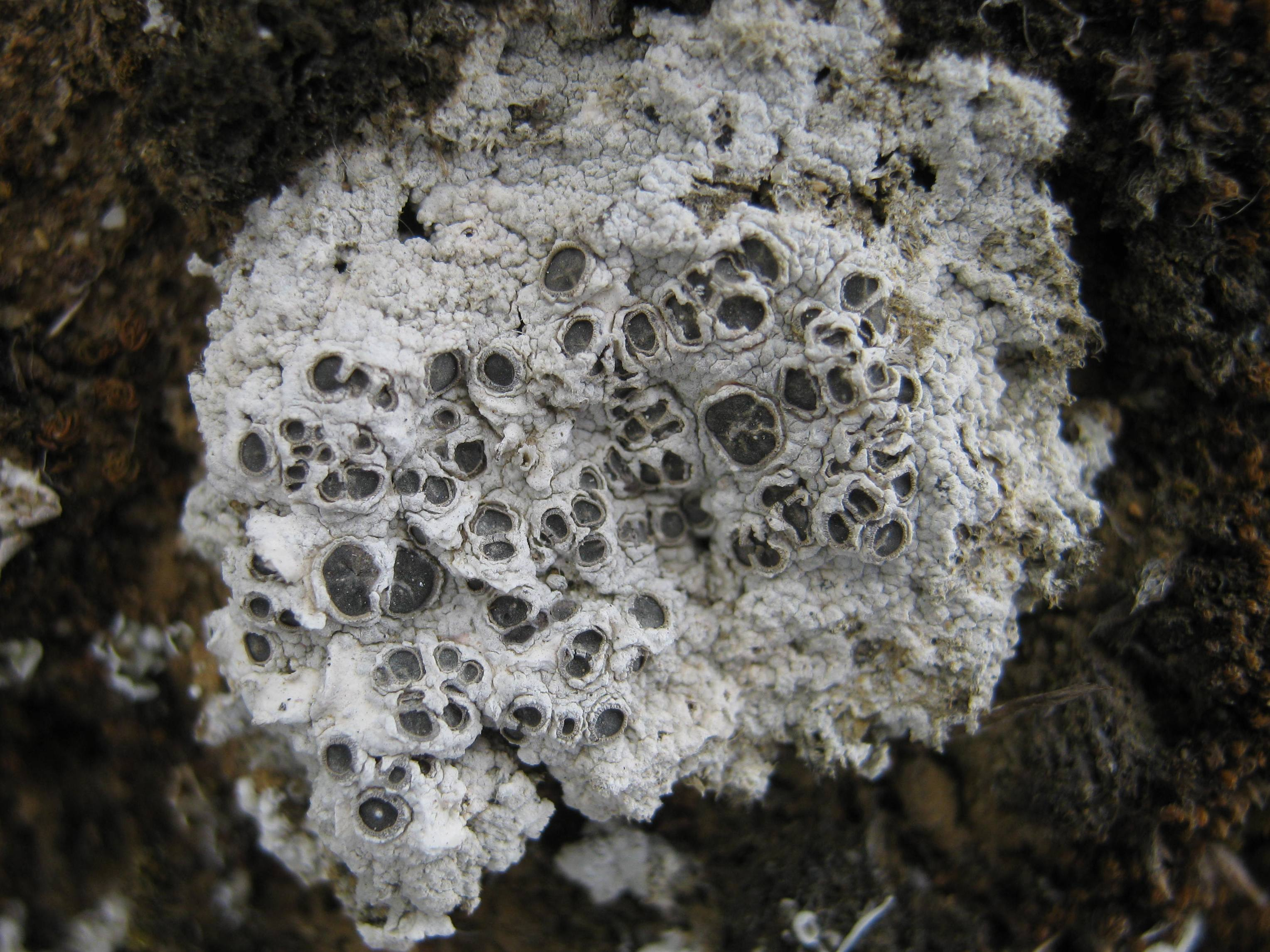
Diploschistes diacapsis

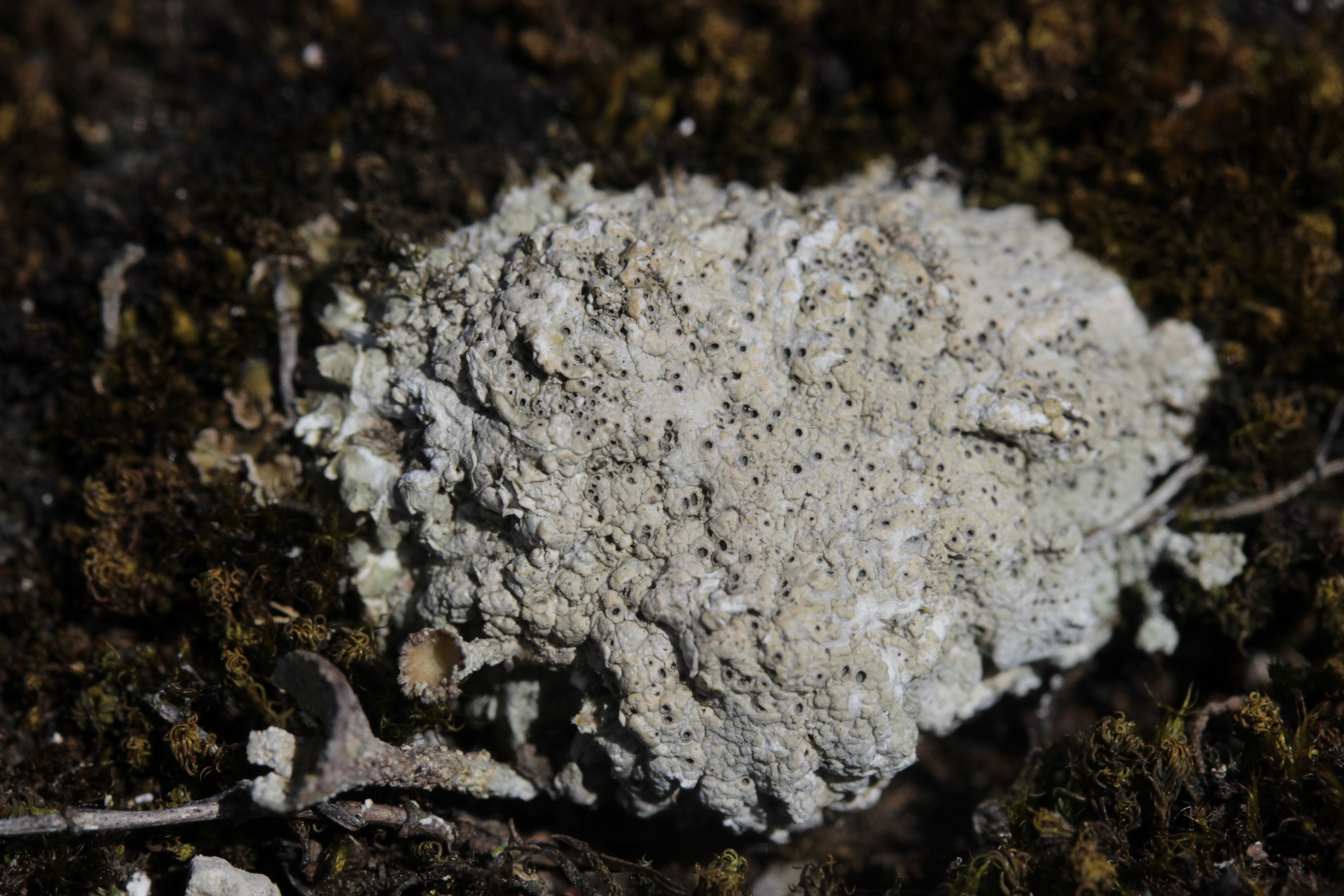
Diploschistes muscorum

- Diploschistes actinostomus (Ach.) Zahlbr. (1892)
- Diploschistes aeneus (Müll.Arg.) Lumbsch (1989)
- Diploschistes albopruinosus Pérez-Vargas, Hern.-Padr. & Elix (2011) – Canary Islands
- Diploschistes almbornii C.W.Dodge (1964)
- Diploschistes caesioplumbeus (Nyl.) Vain. (1921)
- Diploschistes candidissimus (Kremp.) Zahlbr. (1924)
- Diploschistes cinereocaesius (Sw.) Vain. (1921)
- Diploschistes conceptionis Vain. (1899)
- Diploschistes diacapsis (Ach.) Lumbsch (1988)
- Diploschistes diploschistoides (Vain.) G.Salisb. (1972)
- Diploschistes elixii Lumbsch & Mangold (2007)
- Diploschistes euganeus (A.Massal.) J.Steiner (1919)
- Diploschistes farinosus (Anzi) Vězda (1974)
- Diploschistes gypsaceus (Ach.) Zahlbr. (1892)
- Diploschistes gyrophoricus Lumbsch & Elix (1989)
- Diploschistes hensseniae Lumbsch & Elix (1985)
- Diploschistes microsporus Lumbsch & Elix (2003) – Australia
- Diploschistes muscorum (Scop.) R.Sant. (1980)
- Diploschistes neutrophilus (Clauzade & Cl.Roux) Fern.-Brime & Llimona (2013)
- Diploschistes scruposus (Schreb.) Norman (1852)
- Diploschistes sticticus (Körb.) Müll.Arg. (1894)
- Diploschistes thunbergianus (Ach.) Lumbsch & Vězda (1993)
- Diploschistes tianshanensis A.Abbas, S.Y.Guo & Ababaikeli (2016) – China
- Diploschistes wui A.Abbas, S.Y.Guo & Ababaikeli (2018) – China
- Diploschistes xinjiangensis A.Abbas & S.Y.Guo (2015) – China
