= Diploschistes hensseniae =

Scientific classification
- Domain: Eukaryota
- Kingdom: Fungi
- Division: Ascomycota
- Class: Lecanoromycetes
- Order: Graphidales
- Family: Graphidaceae
- Genus: Diploschistes
- Species: D. hensseniae

Binomial name
- Diploschistes hensseniae Lumbsch & Elix (1985)

Species of lichen

Diploschistes hensseniae is a species of terricolous (ground-dwelling), crustose lichen in the family Graphidaceae. Found in Australia, it was scientifically described as a new species in 1985 by the lichenologists H. Thorsten Lumbsch and John Elix. Diploschistes hensseniae is characterised by its distinctive fruiting bodies, which are perithecioid in shape and remain closed. The spores it produces are relatively small, and its asci, the sac-like structures that contain the spores, are cylindrical. Furthermore, Diploschistes hensseniae is chemically unique, containing a combination of diploschistesic, orsellinic, and lecanoric acids that set it apart from other close relatives. The specific epithet hensseniae is named after the Norwegian lichenologist Aino Henssen, commemorating her 60th birthday the same year the species was published.
