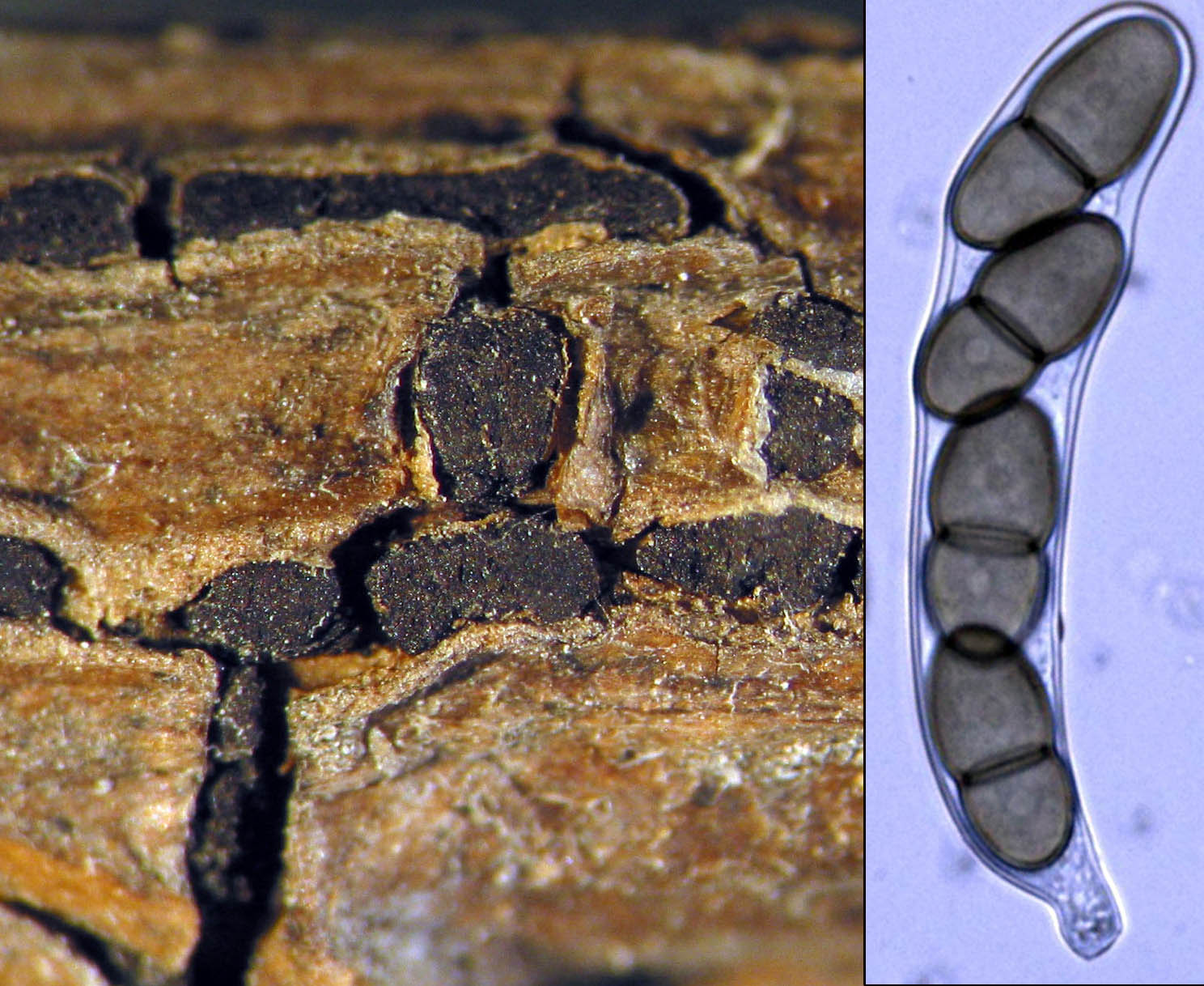
- Dothidea puccinioides

Scientific classification
- Kingdom: Fungi
- Division: Ascomycota
- Class: Dothideomycetes
- Order: Dothideales
- Family: Dothideaceae
- Genus: Dothidea; Fr., 1818

Type species
- Dothidea sambuci (Pers.) Fr. ,1823

= Dothidea =

Genus of fungi

Dothidea is a genus of fungi belonging to the family Dothideaceae. The genus was first described in 1818 by Elias Magnus Fries. The type species is Dothidea sambuci.

The genus has almost cosmopolitan distribution.

== Species ==
As accepted by Species Fungorum;

- Dothidea acerva M.E.Barr
- Dothidea amorphae Rabenh. (1873)
- Dothidea artemisiae (Schwein.) Schwein. (1873)
- Dothidea azmati S.R. Chowdhury (1946)
- Dothidea baccharidis Cooke (1883)
- Dothidea berberidis De Not. (1841)
- Dothidea bullata Fr. (1830)
- Dothidea colliculosa Berk. (1836)
- Dothidea decolorans Fr. (1828)
- Dothidea edgeworthiae Syd., P. Syd. & Hara (1913)
- Dothidea eucalypti Crous (2017)
- Dothidea frangulae Fuckel (1870)
- Dothidea funesta Kunze ex Fr. (1823)
- Dothidea globulosa Cooke & Massee (1888)
- Dothidea hippophaes Fuckel (1868)
- Dothidea insculpta Wallr. (1833)
- Dothidea juglandis Duby (1830)
- Dothidea kunmingensis Ying Gao, Gentekaki & Monkai (2021)
- Dothidea machaeriophila Henn. (1904)
- Dothidea muelleri Loeffler (1957)
- Dothidea neivae Av.-Saccá (1926)
- Dothidea noxia Ruhland (1904)
- Dothidea orgaoensis Henn. (1904)
- Dothidea petiolaris Schwein. (1832)
- Dothidea pulchella (Speg.) Speg. (1918)
- Dothidea rugodisca Cooke & Harkn. (1881)
- Dothidea rutae Mont. (1834)
- Dothidea sambuci (Pers.) Fr. (1823)
- Dothidea stryphnodendri Henn. (1908)
- Dothidea tetraspora Berk. & Broome (1859)
- Dothidea vacciniorum Lév. (1846)

Species Fungorum lists up to 387 records of Dothidea species, but only the above list have stayed as Dothidea, the rest have been moved to various families and genera.
