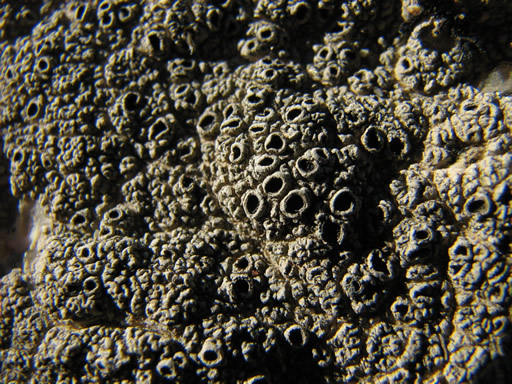
- Diploschistes scruposus

Conservation status
- Secure (NatureServe)

Scientific classification
- Kingdom: Fungi
- Division: Ascomycota
- Class: Lecanoromycetes
- Order: Graphidales
- Family: Graphidaceae
- Genus: Diploschistes
- Species: D. scruposus

Binomial name
- Diploschistes scruposus (Schreb.) Norman (1852)

Synonyms
- Lichen scruposus Schreb. (1771)

= Diploschistes scruposus =

Species of lichen-forming fungus

Diploschistes scruposus (crater lichen) is a pale gray to white, warty to cracked (areolate) crustose lichen with black, urn-shaped (urceolate) fruiting bodies (apothecia). It is found worldwide on growing on rock (saxicolous) that is siliceous, in open areas in Mediterranean, temperate and polar areas, from the low tropics to high altitudes. It is in the family Graphidaceae. In California, it is the most common member of the Diploschistes genus. It is not covered in a powdery white coating (epruinose), which distinguishes it from other members of the genus.

In Nepal, Diploschistes scruposus has been reported from 2,000 to 3,000 m elevation in a compilation of published records.
