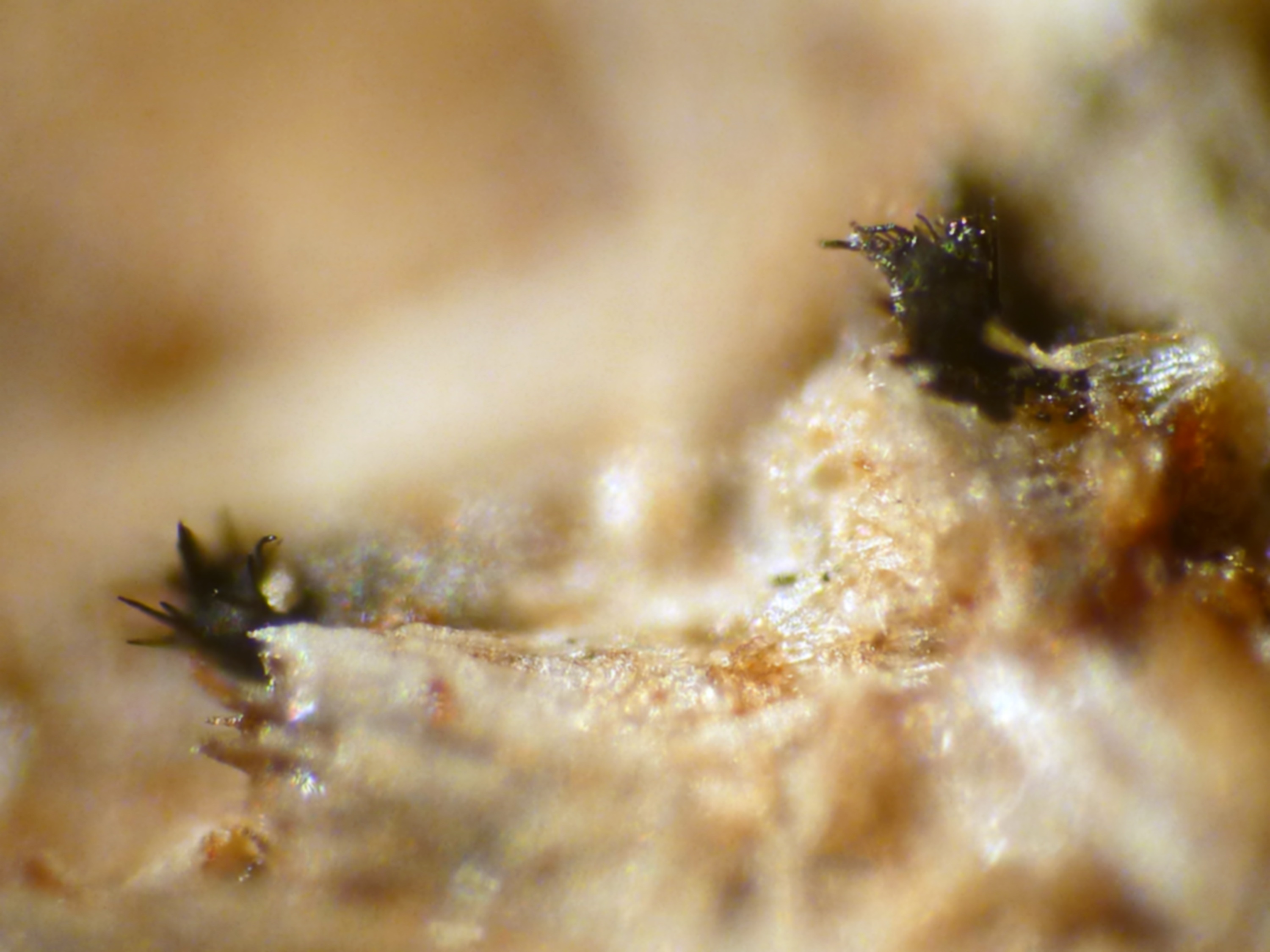
- Trichodelitschia bisporula

Scientific classification
- Kingdom: Fungi
- Division: Ascomycota
- Class: Dothideomycetes
- Subclass: Pleosporomycetidae
- Family: Phaeotrichaceae; Cain & M.E.Barr (1956)

Genera
- Echinoascotheca; Phaeotrichum; Trichodelitschia

= Phaeotrichaceae =

Family of fungi

The Phaeotrichaceae are a family of fungi previously considered to be in the order Pleosporales, but now excluded. Taxa have a widespread distribution and are saprobic, on herbivore dung.
