= Delitschia =

Scientific classification
- Kingdom: Fungi
- Division: Ascomycota
- Class: Dothideomycetes
- Order: Pleosporales
- Family: Delitschiaceae
- Genus: Delitschia; Auersw.

Type species
- Delitschia didyma Auersw.

Genus of fungi

Delitschia is a genus of fungi in the family Delitschiaceae.

The genus name of Delitschia is in honour of Otto Delitsch (1821 - 1882), a German theologist and professor of geography at the Leipzig University.

The genus was circumscribed by Bernhard Auerswald in Hedwigia Vol.5 (Issue 4) on page 49 in 1866.

== Species ==
As accepted by Species Fungorum;

- Delitschia anisomera Luck-Allen & Cain (1975)
- Delitschia anomala Luck-Allen & Cain (1975)
- Delitschia araneosa Cain (1934)
- Delitschia arestospora Luck-Allen & Cain (1975)
- Delitschia bispora Eaton & E.B.G. Jones (1971)
- Delitschia canina Mouton (1887)
- Delitschia chodocola Luck-Allen & Cain (1975)
- Delitschia chorizomera Luck-Allen & Cain (1975)
- Delitschia chrysina Luck-Allen & Cain (1975)
- Delitschia confertaspora Peláez, Polishook, Valldos. & Guarro (1994)
- Delitschia consociata Mouton (1887)
- Delitschia corticola A.I. Romero & Samuels (1991)
- Delitschia crinita Luck-Allen & Cain (1975)
- Delitschia didyma Auersw. (1866)
- Delitschia didymastra Luck-Allen & Cain (1975)
- Delitschia didymella Luck-Allen & Cain (1975)
- Delitschia dochmiophragma Jeng, Luck-Allen & Cain (1977)
- Delitschia elegans Sauterm. (1910)
- Delitschia excentrica Griffiths (1901)
- Delitschia fasciatispora K.D. Hyde (1996)
- Delitschia flavida Luck-Allen & Cain (1975)
- Delitschia furfuracea Niessl (1884)
- Delitschia geminispora Sacc. & Flageolet (1893)
- Delitschia gigaspora Cain (1934)
- Delitschia griffithii Cain (1934)
- Delitschia gymnospora Munk (1966)
- Delitschia hexaspora Luck-Allen & Cain (1975)
- Delitschia illinoisensis Luck-Allen (1975)
- Delitschia intonsa Luck-Allen (1975)
- Delitschia ionthada Jeng, Luck-Allen & Cain (1977)
- Delitschia kriegeriana Kirschst. (1936)
- Delitschia lachnothecium Luck-Allen & Cain (1975)
- Delitschia lamprorhynchia Luck-Allen & Cain (1975)
- Delitschia leporina Griffiths (1901)
- Delitschia leptospora Oudem. (1882)
- Delitschia limasepta Luck-Allen & Cain (1975)
- Delitschia marchalii Berl. & Voglino (1886)
- Delitschia megatetraspora Luck-Allen & Cain (1975)
- Delitschia melanotricha Luck-Allen & Cain (1975)
- Delitschia mesostenospora Jeng, Luck-Allen & Cain (1977)
- Delitschia microspora Oudem. (1882)
- Delitschia myriaspora Breton & Faurel (1970)
- Delitschia nephrospora Luck-Allen & Cain (1975)
- Delitschia niesslii Oudem. (1882)
- Delitschia nypae Jayasiri, E.B.G. Jones & K.D. Hyde (2019)
- Delitschia oligospora Luck-Allen & Cain (1975)
- Delitschia orientalis Furuya & Udagawa (1976)
- Delitschia pachylospora Luck-Allen & Cain (1975)
- Delitschia palmietensis K.D. Hyde & Steinke (1996)
- Delitschia patagonica Speg. (1887)
- Delitschia perpusilla Speg. (1898)
- Delitschia polyspora Griffiths (1901)
- Delitschia proboscidea Munk (1948)
- Delitschia rosellinioides P. Welt & S.-Å. Hanson (2014)
- Delitschia sexdecimspora Jeng, Luck-Allen & Cain (1977)
- Delitschia simulans Luck-Allen & Cain (1975)
- Delitschia spiralirima Jeng, Luck-Allen & Cain (1977)
- Delitschia sydowiana Kirschst. (1911)
- Delitschia tetraspora S.I. Ahmed & Asad (1969)
- Delitschia tetrasporella Luck-Allen & Cain (1975)
- Delitschia timagamensis Cain (1934)
- Delitschia tomentosa Luck-Allen & Cain (1975)
- Delitschia trichodelitschioides M.J. Richardson (1998)
- Delitschia trigonospora Bat. & Peres (1964)
- Delitschia variispora Luck-Allen & Cain (1975)
- Delitschia vulgaris Griffiths (1901)
- Delitschia winteri Plowr. ex G. Winter (1874)
- Delitschia xanthodera Luck-Allen & Cain (1975)

Former species;

- D. apiculata Griffiths (1901) = Arnium apiculatum, Sordariales
- D. auerswaldii sensu auct., non Fuckel = Delitschia patagonica
- D. bisporula (P. Crouan & H. Crouan) E.C. Hansen (1877) = Trichodelitschia bisporula, Phaeotrichaceae
- D. gigaspora var. ceciliae Doveri (2004) = Delitschia gigaspora
- D. gigaspora var. pescanensis Calaça, Xav.-Sant. & Delpont (2015) = Delitschia gigaspora
- D. graminis Niessl (1876) = Cainia graminis, Cainiaceae
- D. insignis Mouton (1897) = Zygospermella insignis, Zygospermellaceae
- D. lignicola Mouton (1886) = Herpotrichia lignicola, Melanommataceae
- D. minuta Fuckel (1870) = Trichodelitschia bisporula, Phaeotrichaceae
- D. moravica Niessl (1876) = Trichodelitschia bisporula, Phaeotrichaceae
- D. sordarioides Speg. (1880) = Cercophora sordarioides, Neoschizotheciaceae
