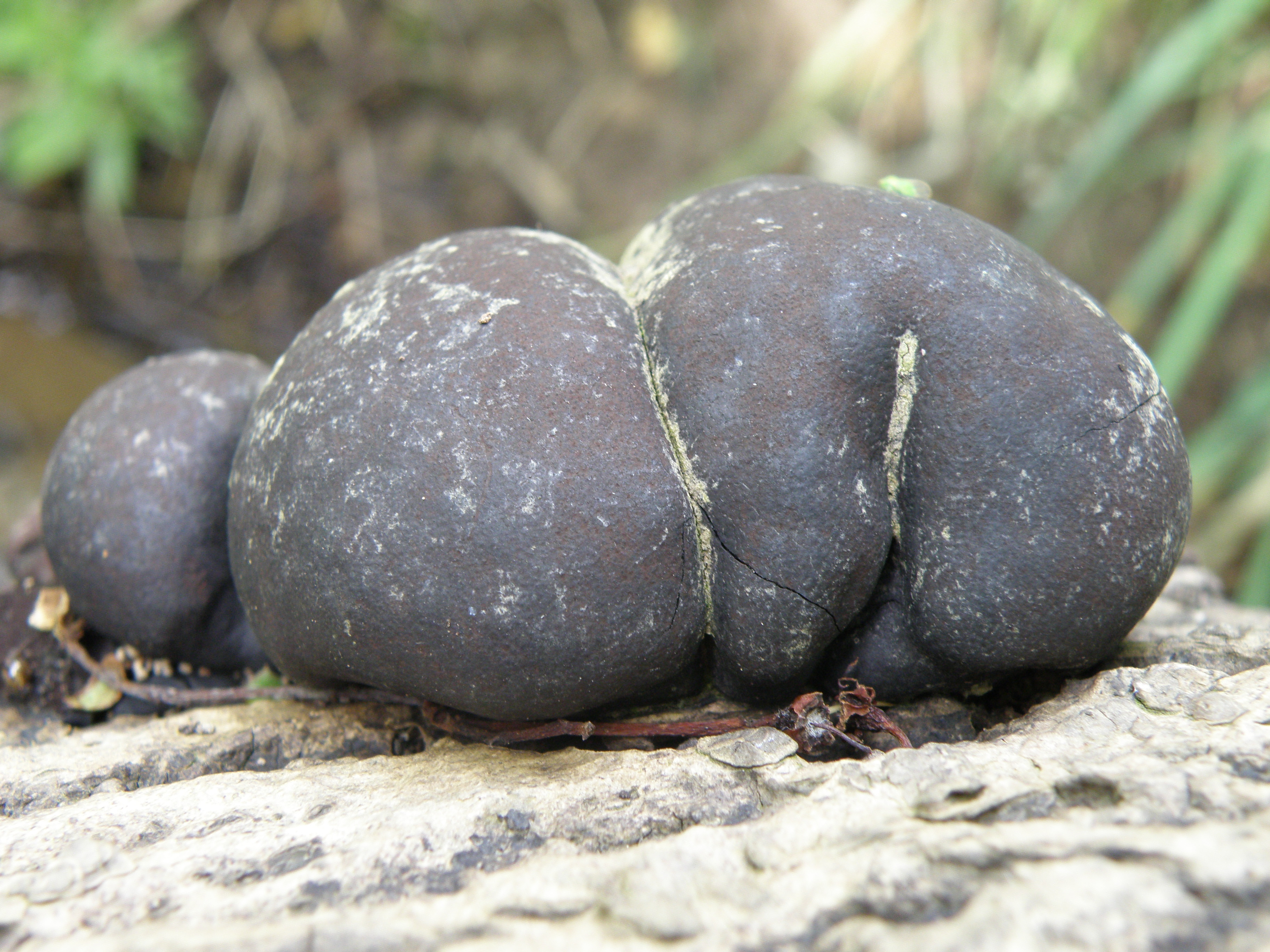
- Daldinia concentrica

Scientific classification
- Domain: Eukaryota
- Kingdom: Fungi
- Division: Ascomycota
- Class: Sordariomycetes
- Order: Xylariales
- Family: Hypoxylaceae
- Genus: Daldinia; Ces. & De Not. (1863)

Type species
- Daldinia concentrica (Bolton) Ces. & De Not. (1863)

= Daldinia =

Genus of fungi

Daldinia is a genus of fungi in the family Hypoxylaceae.

The genus name of Daldinia is in honour of Agostino Daldini (1817–1895), a Swiss clergyman and botanist, a Capuchin friar from Locarno.

The genus was circumscribed by Vincenzo de Cesati in 1863.

== Species ==
As of October 2024, Species Fungorum (in the Catalogue of Life) accept 56 species of Daldinia:

- Daldinia albofibrosa M.Stadler, M.Baumgartner & Wollw. (2001)
- Daldinia andina Læssøe, J.Fourn. & M.Stadler (2014)
- Daldinia australis M.Stadler & J.Fourn. (2014)
- Daldinia bakeri Lloyd (1919)
- Daldinia bambusicola Y.M.Ju, J.D.Rogers & F.San Martín (1997)
- Daldinia barkalovii Lar.N. Vassiljeva & M.Stadler (2008)
- Daldinia brachysperma F.San Martín, Y.M.Ju & J.D.Rogers (1997)
- Daldinia cahuchucosa (Whalley & Watling) M.Stadler & Læssøe (2014)
- Daldinia caldariorum Henn. (1898)
- Daldinia carpinicola Lar.N. Vassiljeva & M.Stadler (2008)
- Daldinia chiangdaoensis Srikit., Wongkan., M.Stadler & Luangsa-ard (2020)
- Daldinia childiae J.D.Rogers & Y.M.Ju (1999)
- Daldinia clavata Henn. (1902)
- Daldinia concentrica (Bolton) Ces. & De Not. (1863)
- Daldinia cudonia (Berk. & M.A.Curtis) Lloyd (1922)
- Daldinia cuprea Starbäck (1901)
- Daldinia decipiens Wollw. & M.Stadler (2001)
- Daldinia dennisii Wollw., J.A.Simpson & M.Stadler (2004)
- Daldinia eschscholtzii (Ehrenb.) Rehm (1904)
- Daldinia fissa Lloyd (1924)
- Daldinia flavogranulata Srikit., Wongkan., M.Stadler & Luangsa-ard (2020)
- Daldinia gelatinoides Lar.N.Vassiljeva (1998)
- Daldinia gelatinosa Y.M.Ju, J.D.Rogers & F.San Martín (1997)
- Daldinia govorovae Lar.N.Vassiljeva & M.Stadler (2008)
- Daldinia graminis Dargan & K.S.Thind (1985)
- Daldinia grandis Child (1932)
- Daldinia grayana Lar.N.Vassiljeva & S.L.Stephenson (2011)
- Daldinia hausknechtii J.Fourn. & M.Stadler (2014)
- Daldinia hawksworthii Pažoutová, Šrůtka & M.Stadler (2013)
- Daldinia korfii Sir & C.Lamb. (2016)
- Daldinia kretzschmarioides (Y.M.Ju & J.D.Rogers) Srikit., Wongkan., M.Stadler & Luangsa-ard (2019)
- Daldinia lloydii Y.M.Ju, J.D.Rogers & F.San Martín (1997)
- Daldinia loculata (Lév.) Sacc. (1882)
- Daldinia loculatoides Wollw. & M.Stadler (2004)
- Daldinia macaronesica M.Stadler, Wollw. & J.M.Castro (2004)
- Daldinia macrospora F.San Martín, Y.M.Ju & J.D.Rogers (1997)
- Daldinia martinii M.Stadler, Venturella & Wollw. (2004)
- Daldinia mexicana F.San Martín, Y.M.Ju & J.D.Rogers (1997)
- Daldinia nemorosa (M.L.Davey) M.Stadler, J.Fourn. & Læssøe (2014)
- Daldinia novae-zelandiae Wollw. & M.Stadler (2004)
- Daldinia occidentalis Child (1932)
- Daldinia palmensis M.Stadler, Wollw. & Tichy (2004)
- Daldinia petriniae Y.M.Ju, J.D.Rogers & F.San Martín (1997)
- Daldinia phadaengensis Srikit., Wongkan., M.Stadler & Luangsa-ard (2020)
- Daldinia pyrenaica M.Stadler & Wollw. (2001)
- Daldinia raimundi M.Stadler, Venturella & Wollw. (2004)
- Daldinia rehmii Læssøe, M.Stadler & J.Fourn. (2013)
- Daldinia sacchari Dargan & K.S.Thind (1985)
- Daldinia simulans Child (1932)
- Daldinia singularis Y.M.Ju, Lar.N.Vassiljeva & J.D.Rogers (1999)
- Daldinia starbaeckii M.Stadler & Læssøe (2013)
- Daldinia steglichii M.Stadler, M.Baumgartner & Wollw. (2001)
- Daldinia subvernicosa Srikit., Wongkan., M.Stadler & Luangsa-ard (2019)
- Daldinia theissenii Læssøe, J.Fourn. & M.Stadler (2014)
- Daldinia vanderguchtiae M.Stadler, Wollw. & Briegert (2004)
- Daldinia vernicosa Ces. & De Not. (1863)
