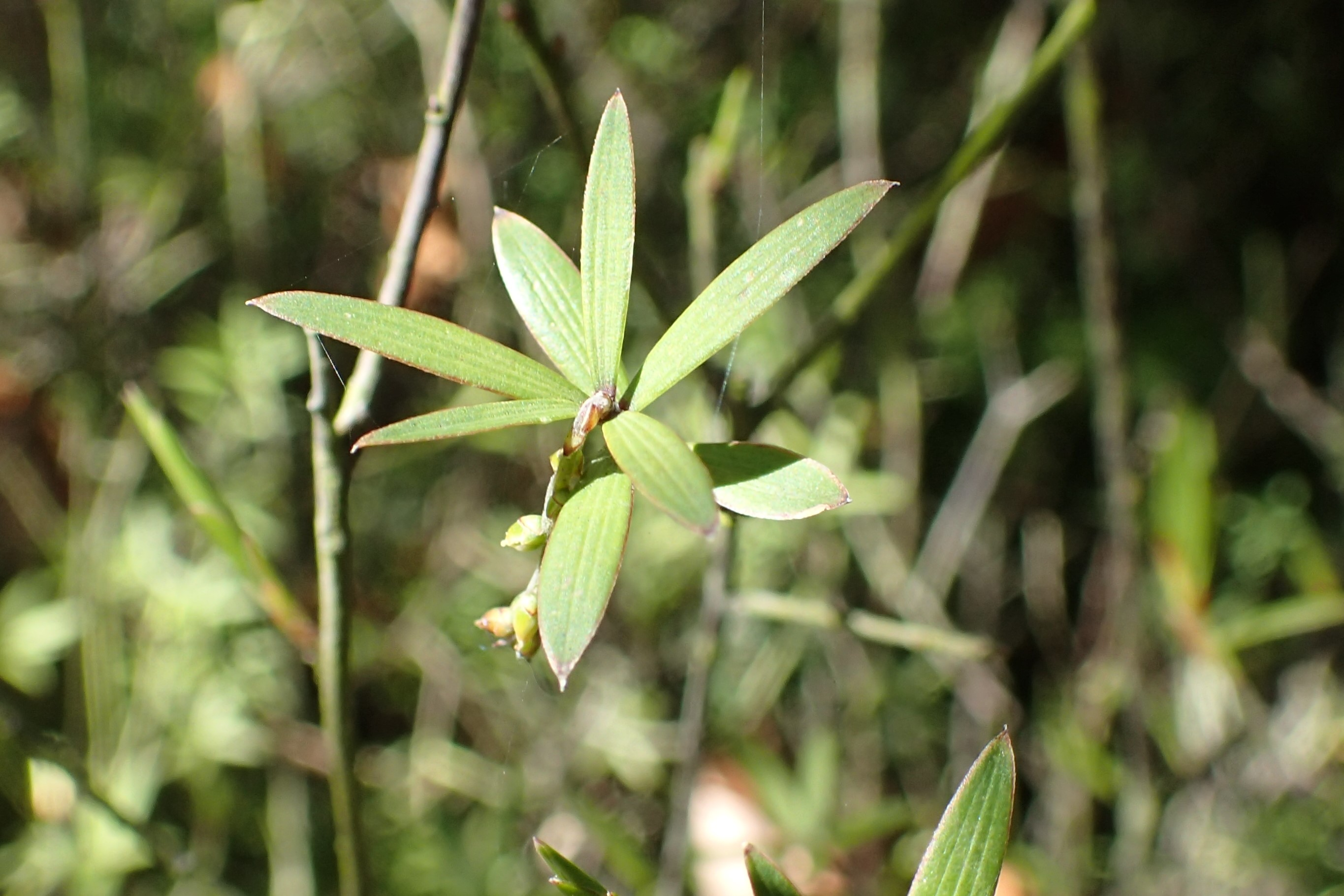

Scientific classification
- Kingdom: Plantae
- Clade: Tracheophytes
- Clade: Angiosperms
- Clade: Eudicots
- Clade: Asterids
- Order: Ericales
- Family: Ericaceae
- Genus: Leucopogon
- Species: L. fasciculatus

Binomial name
- Leucopogon fasciculatus (G.Forst.) A.Rich., 1832
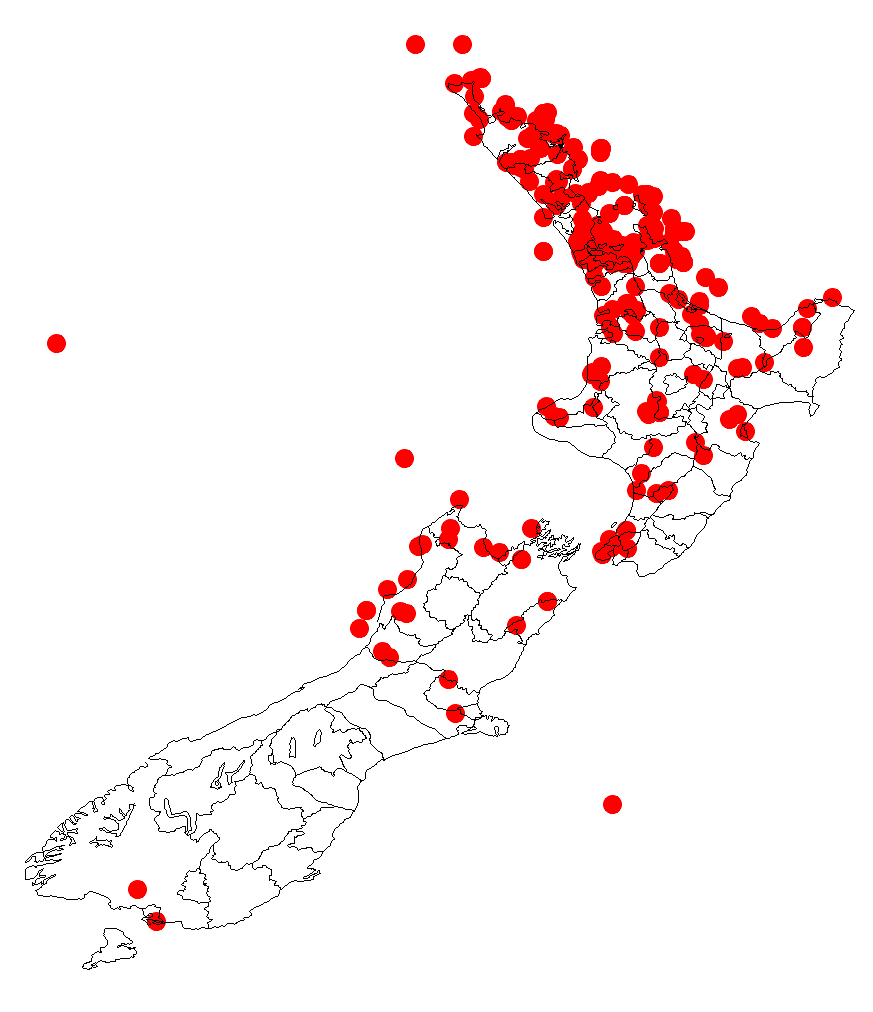
- Occurrence data from AVH

Synonyms
- Epacris fasciculata G.Forst.; Cyathodes fasciculata (G.Forst.) Allan

= Leucopogon fasciculatus =

Species of shrub

Leucopogon fasciculatus, commonly known as tall mingimingi, is a species of shrub within the family Ericaceae. It is endemic to New Zealand. This species is found in the North Island north of the Bay of Plenty and Taranaki. In the South Island, it is found in north west Nelson. It is present in the red and silver beech forests admixed with rimu and miro podocarps in the northern South Island.

Leucopogon fasciculatus is the host plant for the New Zealand endemic moth species Pyrgotis pyramidias.
