= List of coconut palm diseases =

List of diseases of coconut palms (Cocos nucifera):

== Bacterial diseases ==
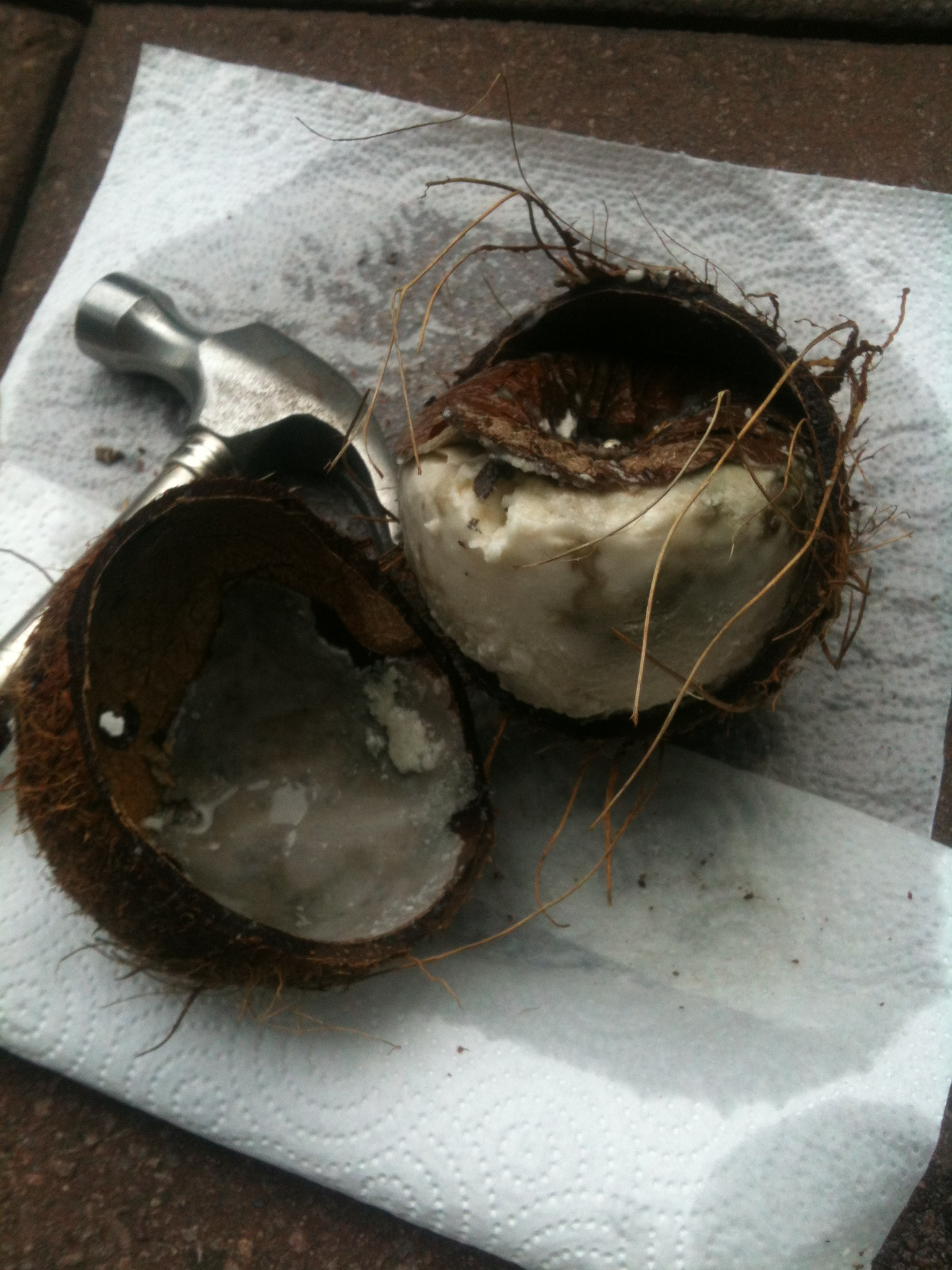
Coconut gone bad: the dark spots are very bitter and the whole meat has turned yellow. The first indication is a bitter taste of the water; this coconut should not be consumed.

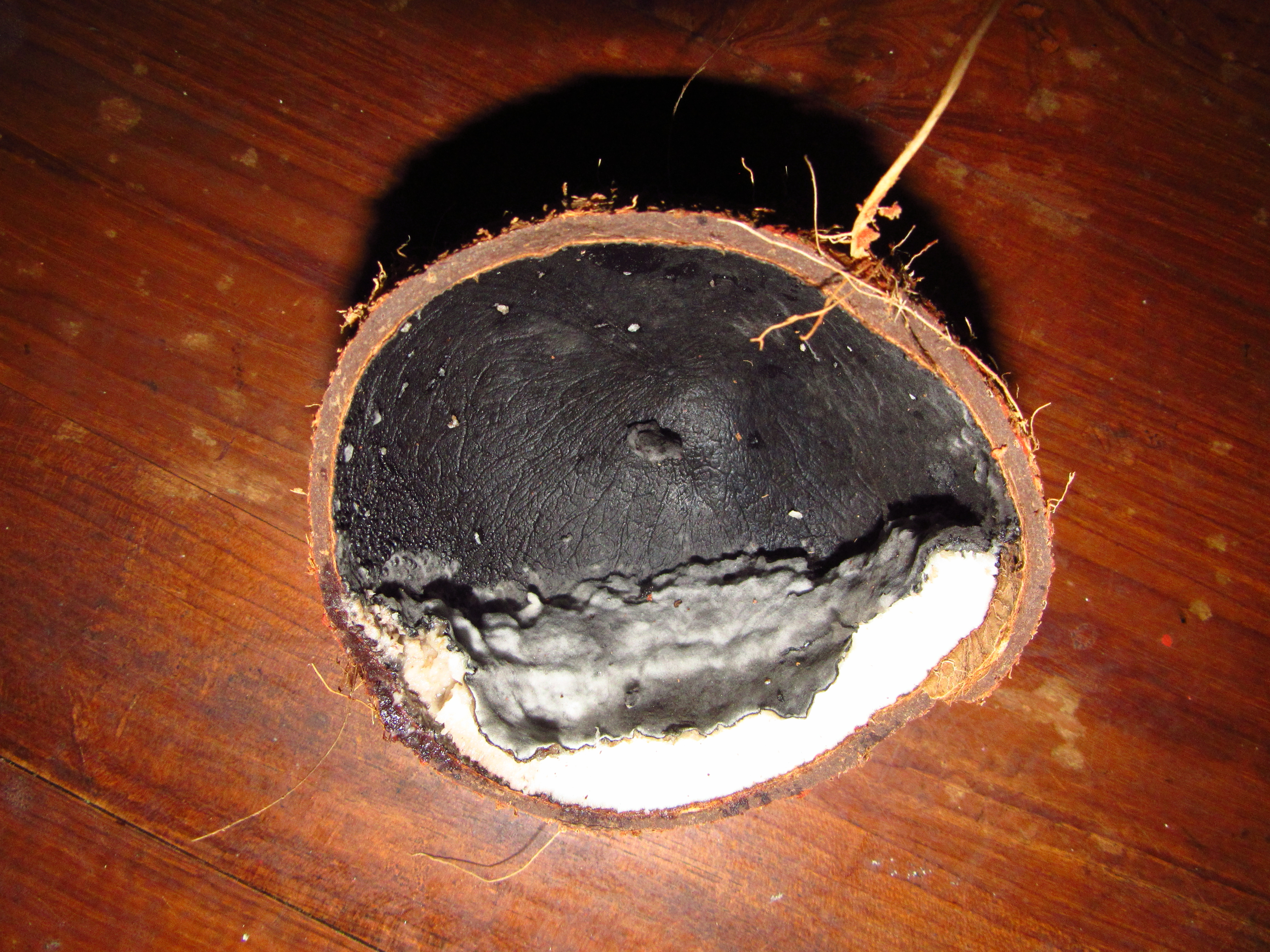

Bacterial diseases
Bacterial bud rot	Erwinia spp.

== Fungal diseases ==
Fungal diseases
Algal leaf spot	Cephaleuros virescens
Anthracnose	Glomerella cingulata (Colletotrichum gloeosporioides, anamorph)
Bitten leaf	Ceratocystis paradoxa (Chalara paradoxa, anamorph)
Bipolaris leaf spot	Bipolaris incurvata
Black scorch	Ceratocystis paradoxa (Chalara paradoxa, Thielaviopsis paradoxa, anamorphs)
Bud rot	Fusarium solani F. verticillioides Graphium sp. Phytophthora katsurae Ph. nicotianae Ph. palmivora
Catacauma leaf spot	Phaeochoropsis mucosa
Damping off	Fusarium spp. Phytophthora spp. Pythium spp. Rhizoctonia solani
Dry basal rot	Ceratocystis paradoxa (Thielaviopsis paradoxa, anamorph)
Ganoderma butt rot	Ganoderma orbiforme G. tornatum G. zonatum
Graphiola leaf spot	Graphiola phoenicis
Gray leaf blight	Pestalotiopsis palmarum
Koleroga	Phytophthora palmivora
Leaf blight	Cytospora palmarum
Leaf spots	Alternaria sp. Botryosphaeria disrupta Capitorostrum cocoes Cercospora sp. Cochliobolus lunatus Cylindrocladium pteridis Drechslera gigantea D. halodes Epicoccum nigrum Helminthosporium sp. Macrophoma sp. Macrosporium cocos Melanconium sp. Mycosphaerella palmicola Periconiella cocoes Pseudoepicoccum cocos Phomopsis sp. Phyllosticta palmetto Ramularia necator
Lethal bole rot	Marasmiellus cocophilus
Lixa grande	Camarotella costaricensis, Coccostromopsis palmicola
Lixa pequeña	Camarotella acrocomiae
Nut fall	Fusarium verticillioides Graphium sp. Phytophthora katsurae Ph. nicotianae Ph. palmivora
Queima das folhas	Botryosphaeria cocogena Lasiodiplodia theobromae
Root rot	Fusarium spp. Phytophthora spp. Pythium spp. Rhizoctonia solani
Stem bleeding	Ceratocystis paradoxa (Chalara paradoxa, Thielaviopsis paradoxa, anamorphs) Thielaviopsis spp.
Stigmina leaf spot	Stigmina palmivora
Thread blight	Ceratobasidium noxium Corticium penicillatum Pellicularia filamentosa

== Virus and viroid ==
diseases
Cadang-cadang	Coconut cadang-cadang viroid
Foliar decay	ssDNA virus, identity uncertain
Tinangaja	Coconut tinangaja viroid
Natuna wilt	Not known
Premature decline	Not known
Soccoro wilt	Not known

== Phytoplasmal diseases ==
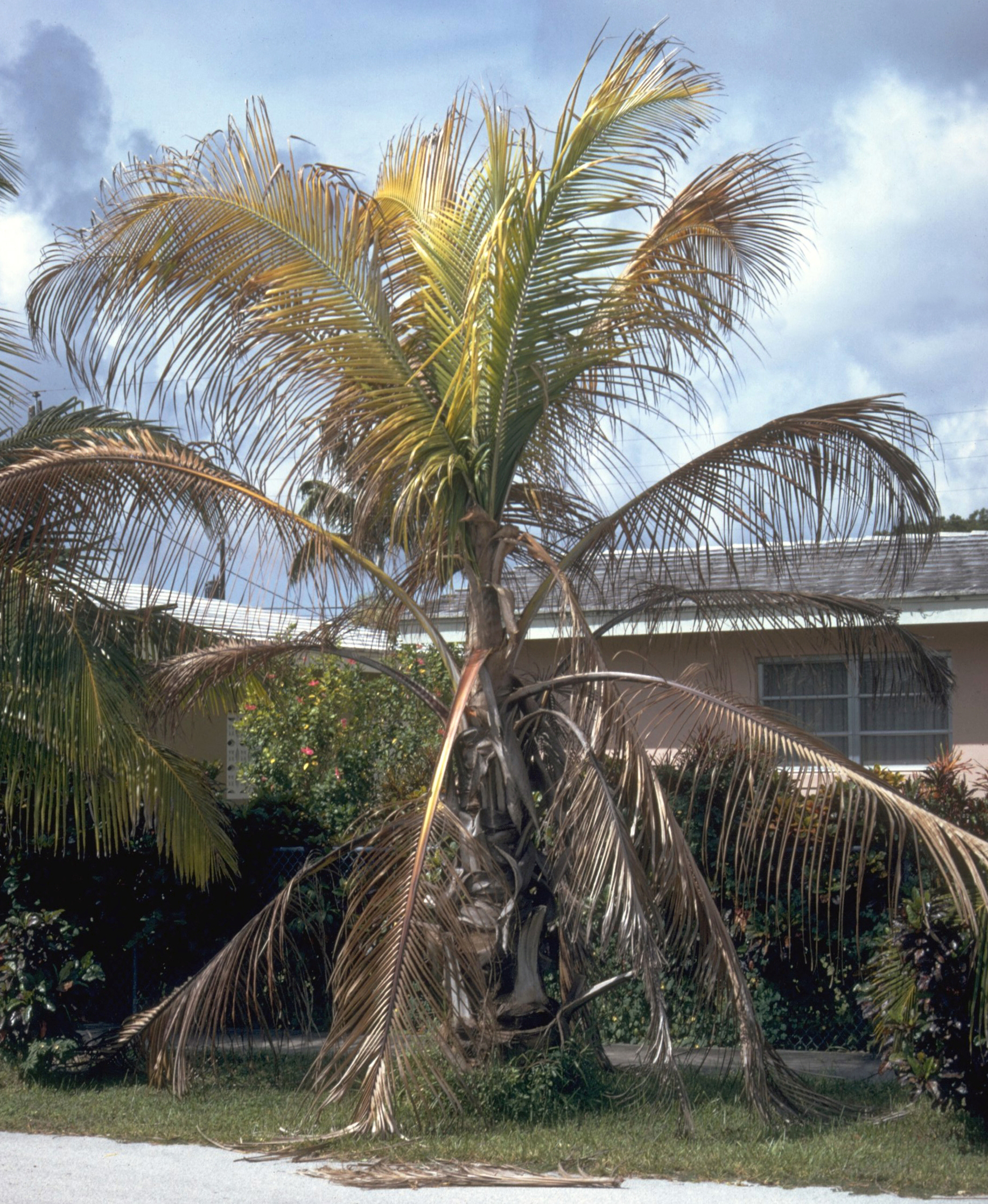
A coconut palm with lethal yellowing

Phytoplasmal diseases
Awka disease/Texas phoenix palm decline	Candidatus Phytoplasma palmae
Blast	Candidatus Phytoplasma suspected
Cape St. Paul wilt	Ca. Phytoplasma
Cedros wilt	Phytomonas sp.
Heart rot	Phytomonas sp.
Kaincope disease	Ca. Phytoplasma
Kalimantan wilt	Ca. Phytoplasma suspected
Kribi disease	Ca. Phytoplasma
Lethal decline	Ca. Phytoplasma
Lethal disease	Ca. Phytoplasma
Lethal yellowing	Ca. Phytoplasma
Pudricion del cogollo	Ca. Phytoplasma
Root wilt disease	Ca. Phytoplasma
Stem necrosis	Ca. Phytoplasma suspected

== Miscellaneous diseases and disorders ==
Miscellaneous diseases and disorders
Bristle top	Not known
Dry bud rot	Not known, but possibly vectored by the insects Sogatella kolophon and S. cubana (Tagosodes cubana)
Finschafen disease	Not known
Frond rot	Physiological disorder
Leaf scorch decline	Not known
Malaysia wilt	Not known
Red ring disease	Bursaphelenchus cocophilus (nematode)
Porroca disease	not known
Coconut lethal crown atrophy	Not known
