= Cocos =

Cocos may refer to:

== Geography ==
- Cocos, Bahia, Brazil
- Cocos, Quebradillas, Puerto Rico, a barrio
- Cocos Island (disambiguation)
  - Cocos (Keeling) Islands, a territory of Australia in the Indian Ocean
    - Shire of Cocos, a local government area
- Cocos Lagoon, south of Guam
- Cocos Plate, a tectonic plate beneath the Pacific Ocean
- rivers in Romania:
  - Cocoș, a tributary of the Aita in Covasna County
  - Cocoș (Constanța), a river in Constanța County
  - Cocoș, a tributary of the Ilișoara Mare in Mureș County

== Biology ==
- Cocos (plant), a plant genus with the coconut as its only accepted living species
- Eoophyla cocos, a moth of family Crambidae
- Macrosporium cocos, a fungus of family Pleosporaceae
- Pseudoepicoccum cocos, a fungus of family Incertae sedis

== People ==
- Cocos Malays, an ethnic group inhabiting the Cocos (Keeling) Islands
- Orang Cocos, an ethnic group in Malaysia descended from Cocos Malay immigrants
- Roxana Cocoș (born 1989), Romanian weightlifter

== Other uses ==
- Battle of Cocos, 1914 naval battle near the Cocos (Keeling) Islands
- Cocos2d, an open source software framework
- Coco's Bakery, a chain of restaurants in California.
- Cocoș Monastery, Isaccea, Romania

== See also ==
- Coco (disambiguation)
- Coconut (disambiguation)
