= Coconut milk =

Liquid extracted from coconuts

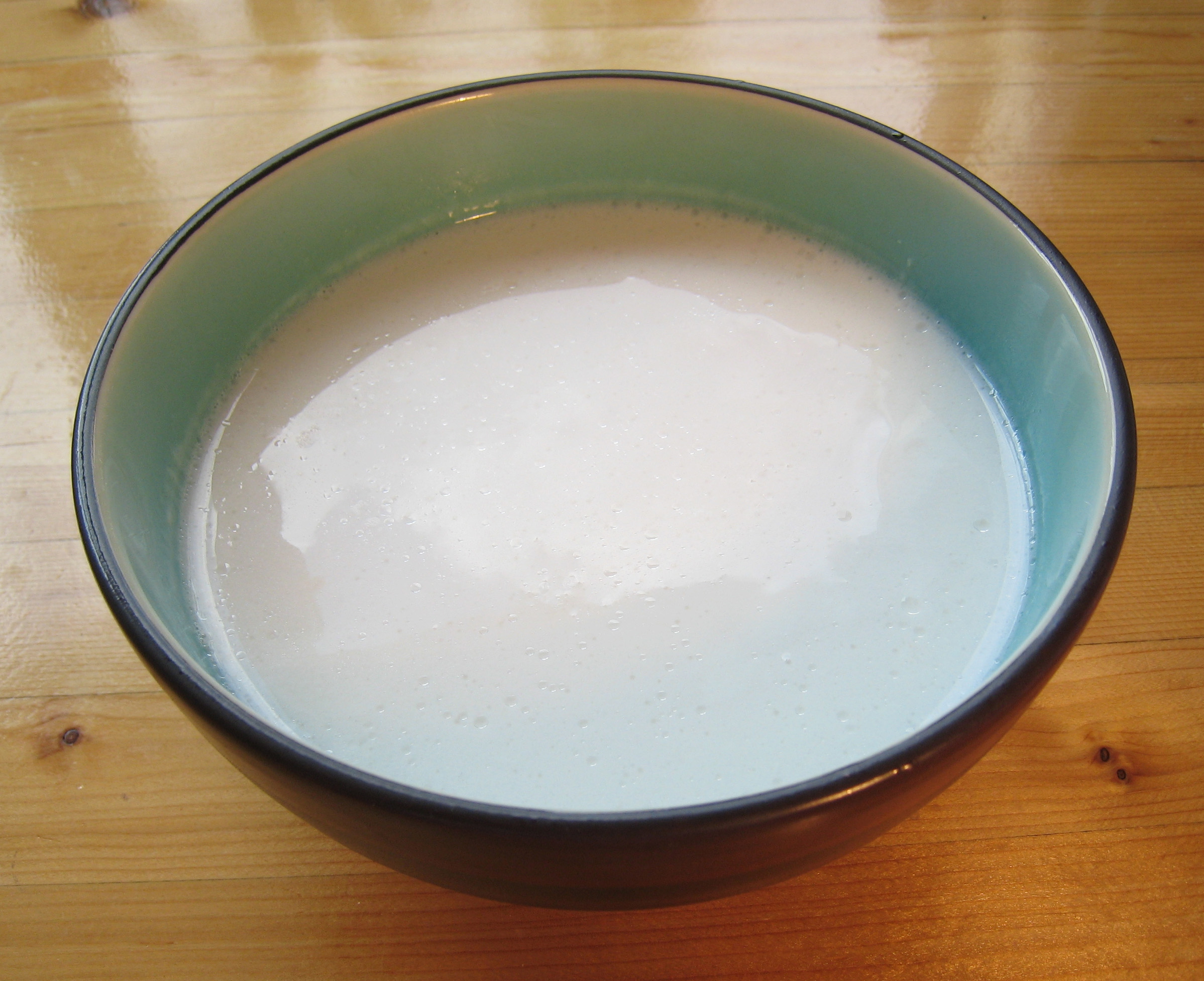
- Region or state: Traditional: Southeast Asia, Oceania, South Asia, East Africa; Introduced: Caribbean, Central America, northern parts of South America, West Africa
- Main ingredients: Coconut

Coconut milk is a plant milk extracted from the grated pulp of mature coconuts. The opacity and rich taste of the milky-white liquid are due to its high oil content, most of which is saturated fat. Coconut milk is a traditional food ingredient used in Southeast Asia, Oceania, South Asia, and East Africa. It is also used for cooking in the Caribbean, Central America, northern parts of South America and West Africa, where coconuts were introduced during the colonial era.

Coconut milk is differentiated into subtypes based on fat content. They can be generalized into coconut cream (or thick coconut milk) with the highest amount of fat; coconut milk (or thin coconut milk) with a maximum of around 20% fat; and coconut skim milk with negligible amounts of fat. Coconut cream can be dehydrated as coconut milk powder, with a far longer shelf life. This terminology is not always followed in commercial coconut milk sold in Western countries.

Coconut milk can also be used to produce milk substitutes (sometimes differentiated as "coconut milk beverages"); these products are meant for drinking, not cooking. A sweetened, processed, coconut milk product from Puerto Rico is also known as cream of coconut, but is distinct from coconut cream and is not interchangeable. It is used in many desserts and beverages like the piña colada.

== Nutrition ==
Coconut milk, raw (liquid expressed from grated pulp and water)
Nutritional value per 100 g
- Energy: 962 kJ (230 kcal)
- Carbohydrates: 5.5 g
- Sugars: 3.3 g
- Dietary fibre: 2.2 g
- Fat: 23.8 g
- Saturated: 21.1 g
- Monounsaturated: 1.0 g
- Polyunsaturated: 0.26 g
- Protein: 2.3 g
Vitamins and minerals
Vitamins	Quantity %DV^{†}
Vitamin A equiv. beta-Carotene	0% 0 μg 0% 0 μg
Thiamine (B1)	3% 0.03 mg
Riboflavin (B2)	0% 0 mg
Niacin (B3)	5% 0.76 mg
Pantothenic acid (B5)	4% 0.18 mg
Vitamin B6	2% 0.03 mg
Folate (B9)	4% 16 μg
Vitamin C	3% 2.8 mg
Vitamin E	1% 0.15 mg
Vitamin K	0% 0.1 μg
Minerals	Quantity %DV^{†}
Calcium	1% 16 mg
Iron	9% 1.6 mg
Magnesium	9% 37 mg
Manganese	40% 0.92 mg
Phosphorus	8% 100 mg
Potassium	9% 263 mg
Sodium	1% 15 mg
Zinc	6% 0.67 mg
- Other constituents: Quantity
- Water: 67.6 g
- Full Report from the USDA FoodData Central Database
- ^{†}Percentages estimated using US recommendations for adults, except for potassium, which is estimated based on expert recommendation from the National Academies.

In a 100 milliliter (ml) portion, coconut milk contains 230 kilocalories and is 68% water, 24% total fat, 6% carbohydrates, and 2% protein (table). The fat composition includes 21 grams of saturated fat, half of which is lauric acid (table).

Coconut milk is a rich source (20% or more of the Daily Value, DV) of manganese (40% DV per 100 g), with no other micronutrients in notable content (table for USDA source).

== Definition and terminology ==
Coconut milk is a relatively stable oil-in-water emulsion with proteins that act as emulsifiers and thickening agents. It is opaque and milky white in color and ranges in consistency from watery to creamy. Based on fat content, coconut milk is divided into different subtypes generally simplified into "coconut cream", "coconut milk", and "coconut skim milk", from highest to lowest respectively. Coconut milk and coconut cream (also called "thin coconut milk" and "thick coconut milk", respectively) are traditionally differentiated in countries where coconuts are native based on the stages of extraction. They are also differentiated in modern standards set by the Asian and Pacific Coconut Community (APCC) and the Food and Agriculture Organization of the United Nations (FAO). However, the terminologies are not always followed in commercial coconut milk (especially in western countries) because these standards are not mandatory. This can cause confusion among consumers.

The Asian and Pacific Coconut Community standardizes coconut milk and coconut cream products as:

Range of fat by weight in coconut cream and milk (APCC Standards)
Product	Fat content (%m/m)
Concentrated coconut cream	40–50
High-fat coconut cream	30–39
Medium-fat coconut cream	25–29
Low-fat coconut cream	20–25
High-fat coconut milk	15–20
Medium-fat coconut milk	10–15
Low-fat coconut milk	5–10
Coconut skim milk	0–1.5

The Codex Alimentarius of the FAO standardizes coconut milk and coconut cream products as:

Classification of coconut milk and cream (CODEX STAN 240-2003, Codex Alimentarius, FAO)
Product	Total solids (%m/m) min.–max.	Non-fat solids (%m/m) min.	Fat (%m/m) min.	Moisture (%m/m) max.	pH
Light coconut milk	6.6–12.6	1.6	5	93.4	5.9
Coconut milk	12.7–25.3	2.7	10	87.3	5.9
Coconut cream	25.4–37.3	5.4	20	74.6	5.9
Coconut cream concentrate	37.4 min.	8.4	29	62.6	5.9

Coconut milk can also sometimes be confused with coconut water. Coconut water is the clear fluid found within the coconut seed, while coconut milk is the extracted liquid derived from the manual or mechanical crushing of the white inner flesh of mature coconuts. Coconut cream should also not be confused with creamed coconut, which is a semi-solid paste made from finely ground coconut pulp, and cream of coconut, which is a processed product made from heavily sweetened coconut cream.

== Traditional preparation ==
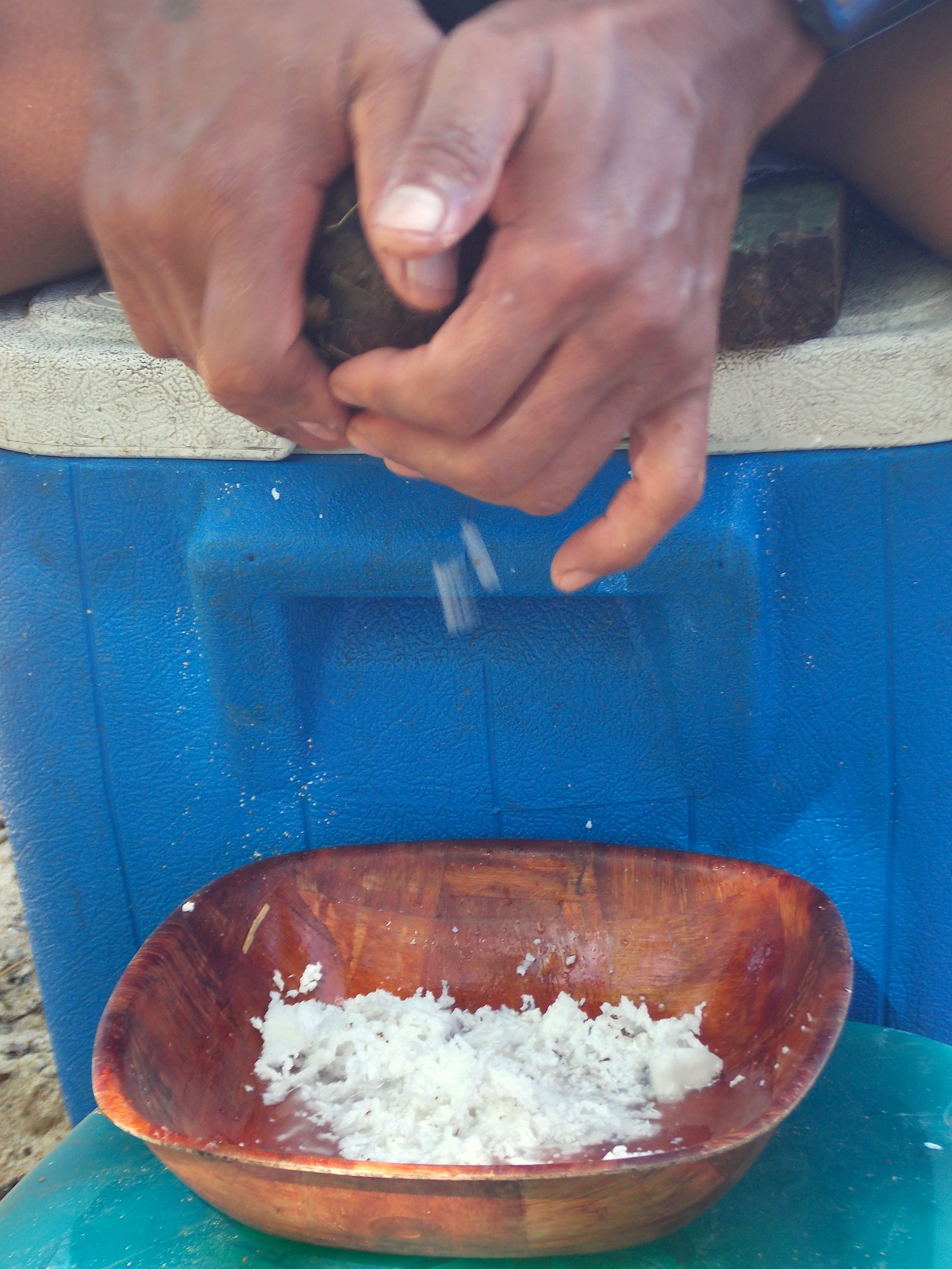
Coconut being grated

Coconut milk is traditionally made by grating the white inner flesh of mature coconuts and mixing the shredded coconut pulp with a small amount of hot water in order to suspend the fat present in the grated pulp. The grating process can be carried out manually or by machine. Polynesians may use special bundles of fibre from sea hibiscus, heliconia or the coconut itself called tauaga to wring the milk from the meat.

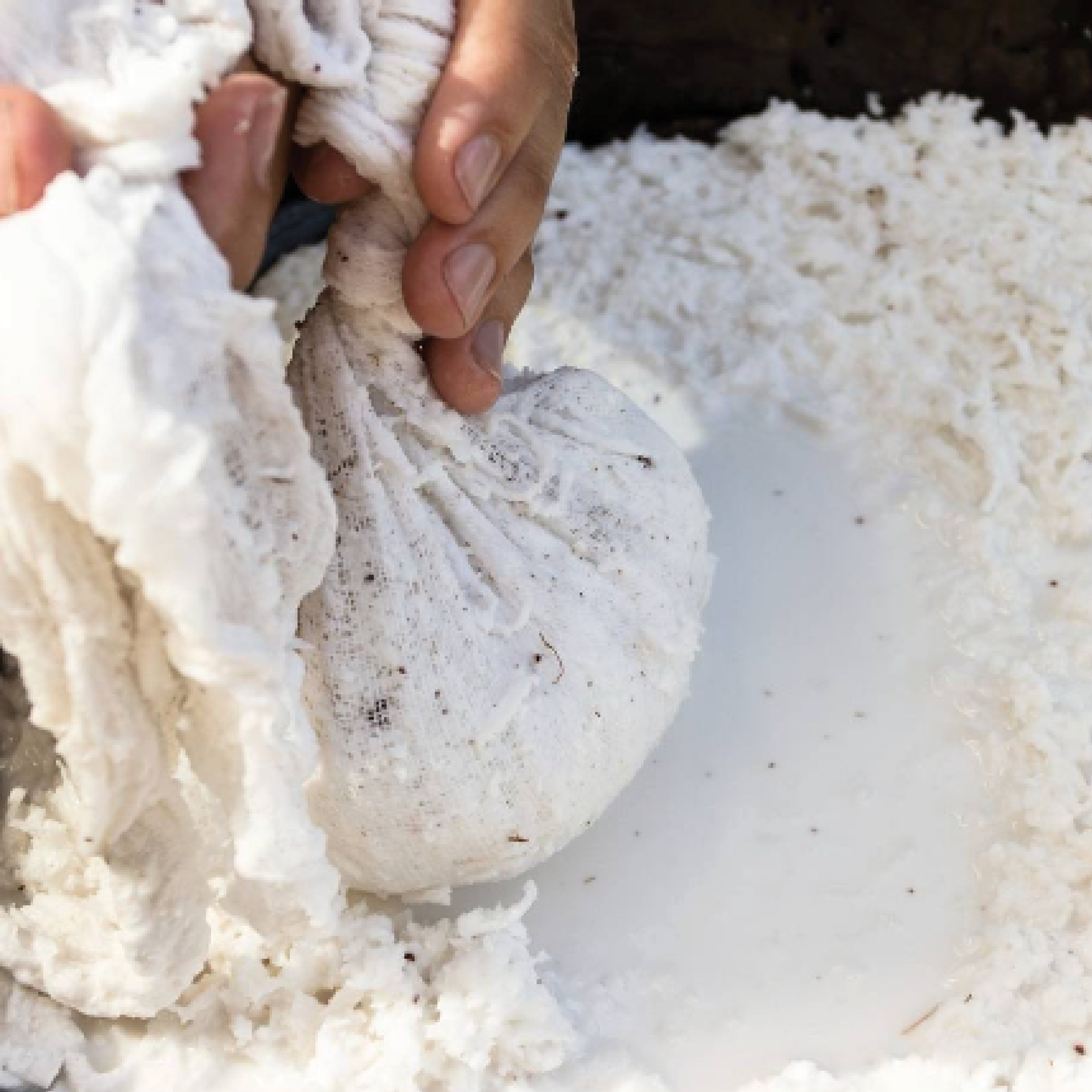
Grated coconut being pressed through cheesecloth

Coconut milk is traditionally divided into two grades: coconut cream (or thick coconut milk) and thin coconut milk. Coconut cream contains around 20% to 50% fat, and (thin) coconut milk contains 5% to 20% fat. Coconut cream is extracted from the first pressings of grated coconut pulp directly through cheesecloth. Sometimes a small amount of hot water is added, but usually coconut cream is extracted with no added water. Thin coconut milk is produced by subsequent pressings after soaking the squeezed coconut pulp with hot water.

Gravity separation can also be used to derive a top layer of coconut cream and a bottom layer of coconut skim milk. This is achieved by simply allowing the extracted liquid to stand for an hour. Conversely, coconut cream can be diluted into thinner coconut milk by simply adding water.

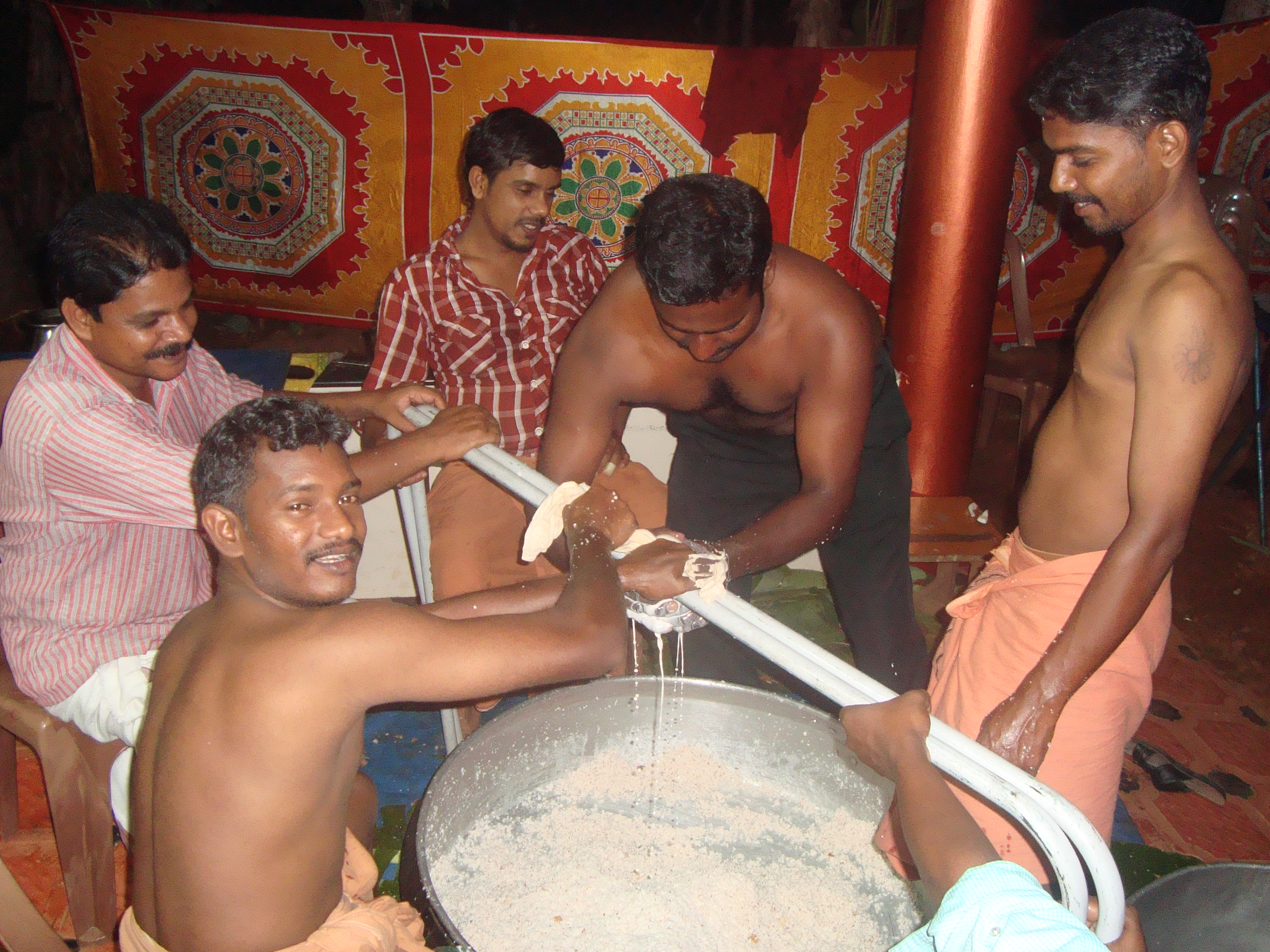
Coconut milk preparation

Traditionally prepared coconut milk is utilized immediately after being freshly extracted because it spoils easily when exposed to air. It becomes rancid after a few hours at room temperatures 28 to 30 °C (82 to 86 °F) due to lipid oxidation and lipolysis. Rancid coconut milk gives off a strong unpleasant smell and has a distinctive soapy taste.

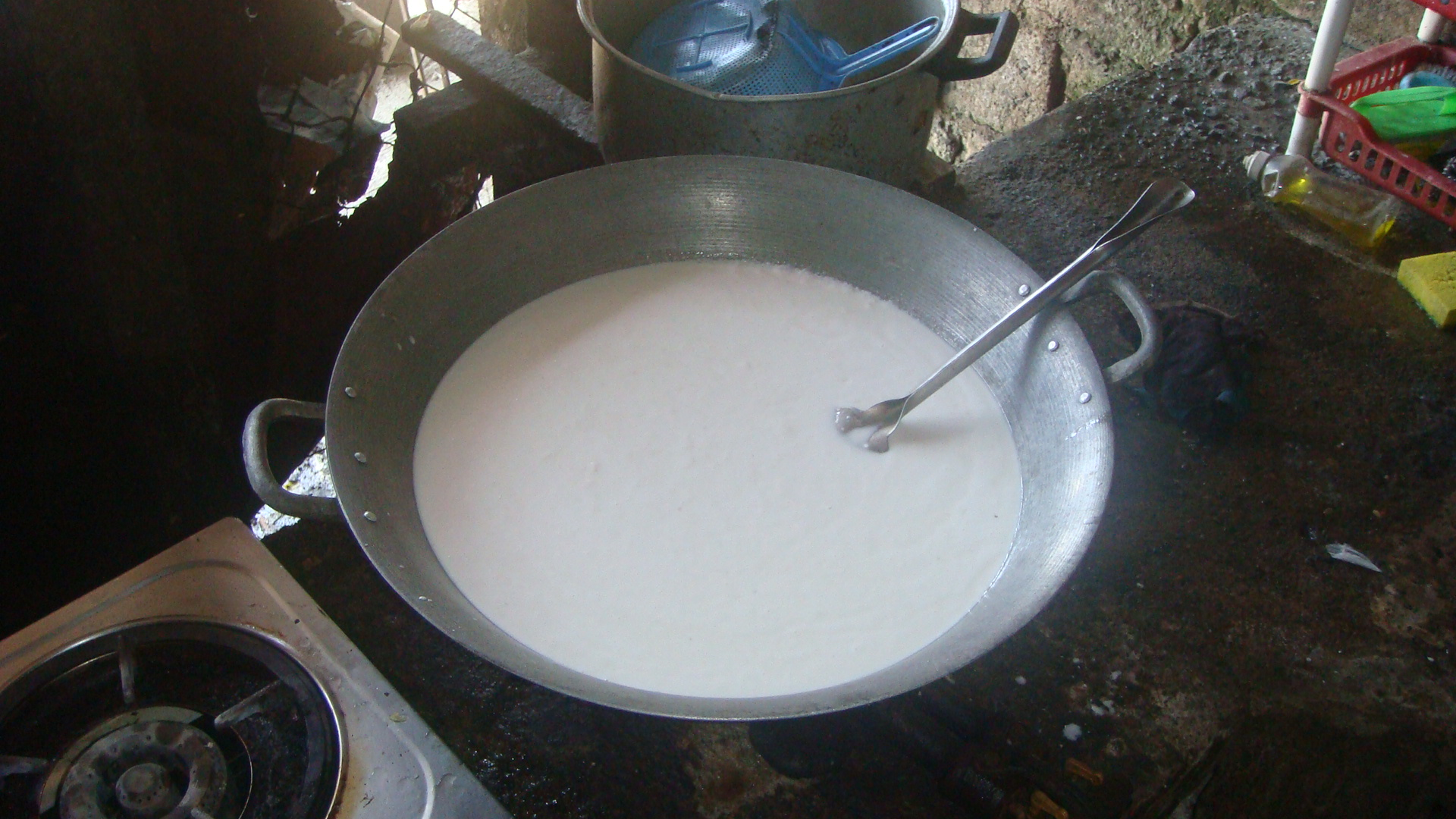
Thick coconut cream derived from the first pressings of the grated coconut

As coconut cream contains a higher amount of soluble, suspended solids, it works well as a good ingredient for desserts and rich and dry sauces. Thinner milk contains a lesser amount of soluble solids, and is mainly used in general cooking. The distinction between coconut cream and thin coconut milk is not usually made in western nations as fresh coconut milk is uncommon in these countries, and most consumers buy coconut milk or cream in cartons or cans.

Coconut milk is also an intermediate step in the traditional wet process methods of producing virgin coconut oil by gradual heating, churning, or fermentation. These methods, however, are less efficient than coconut oil production from copra.

=== Coconut graters ===
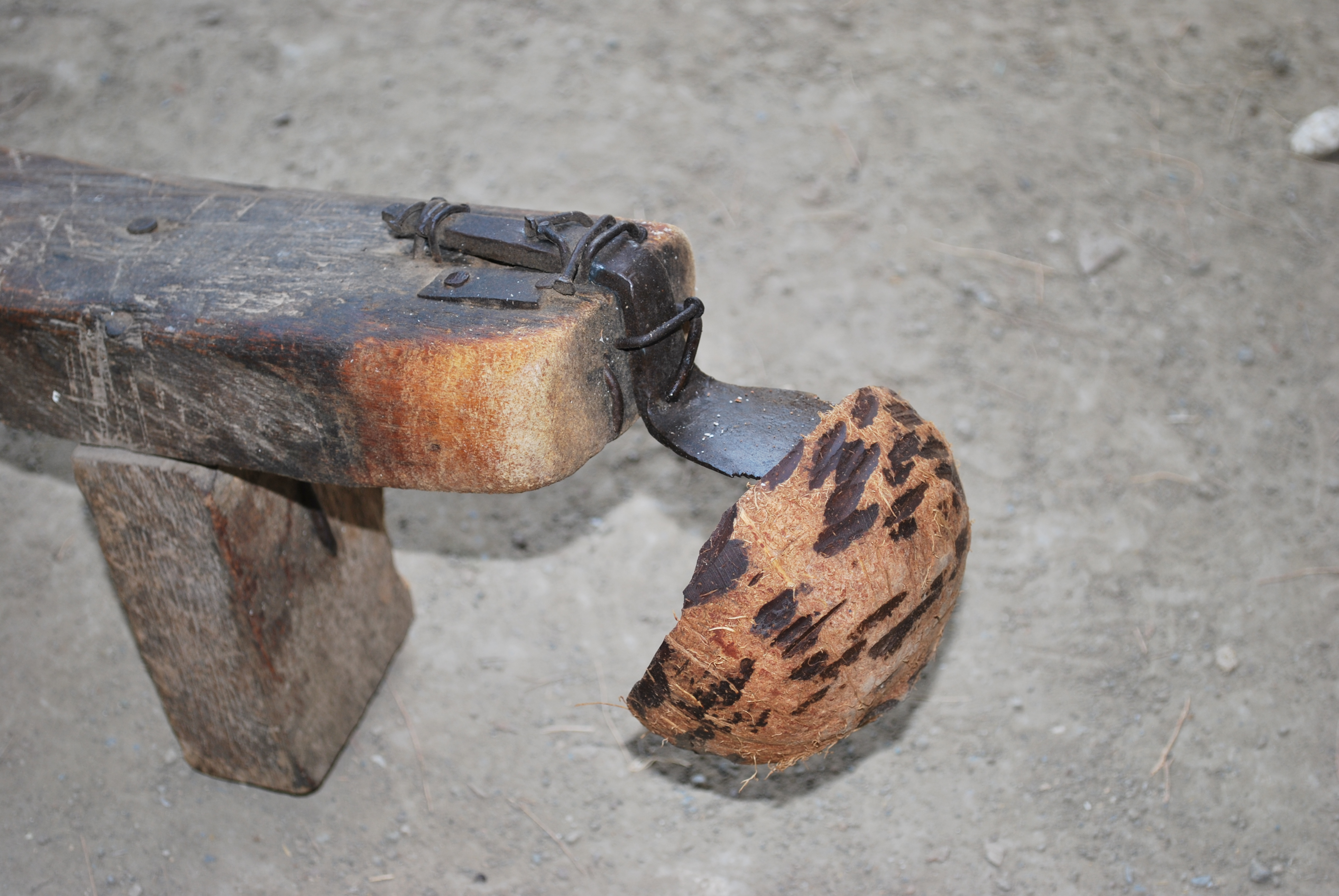
Traditional coconut grater

Coconut graters (also called "coconut scrapers"), a necessary tool for traditionally extracting coconut milk, were part of the material culture of the Austronesian peoples. From Island Southeast Asia, it was carried along with the sea voyages of the Austronesian expansion both for colonization and trade, reaching as far as Polynesia in the east, and Madagascar and the Comoros in the west in prehistoric times. The technology also spread to non-Austronesian cultures in coastal East Africa by proximity. Manual coconut graters remain a standard kitchen equipment in households in the tropical Asia-Pacific and Eastern Africa, underscoring the importance of coconut milk and coconut oil extraction in the Indo-Pacific.

The basic design of coconut graters consists of a low bench or stool with a horizontal serrated disk (made of metal in Asia and Africa, and stone or shell in Oceania) attached on one end. A person sits on the bench and repeatedly scrapes the inner surface of halved coconut shells with both hands over the metal disk. The scrapings are gathered by a container placed below.

More modern mechanical coconut graters dating back to the mid-1800s consist of serrated blades with a hand crank. This version is believed to be a British invention.

== Processed coconut milk products ==
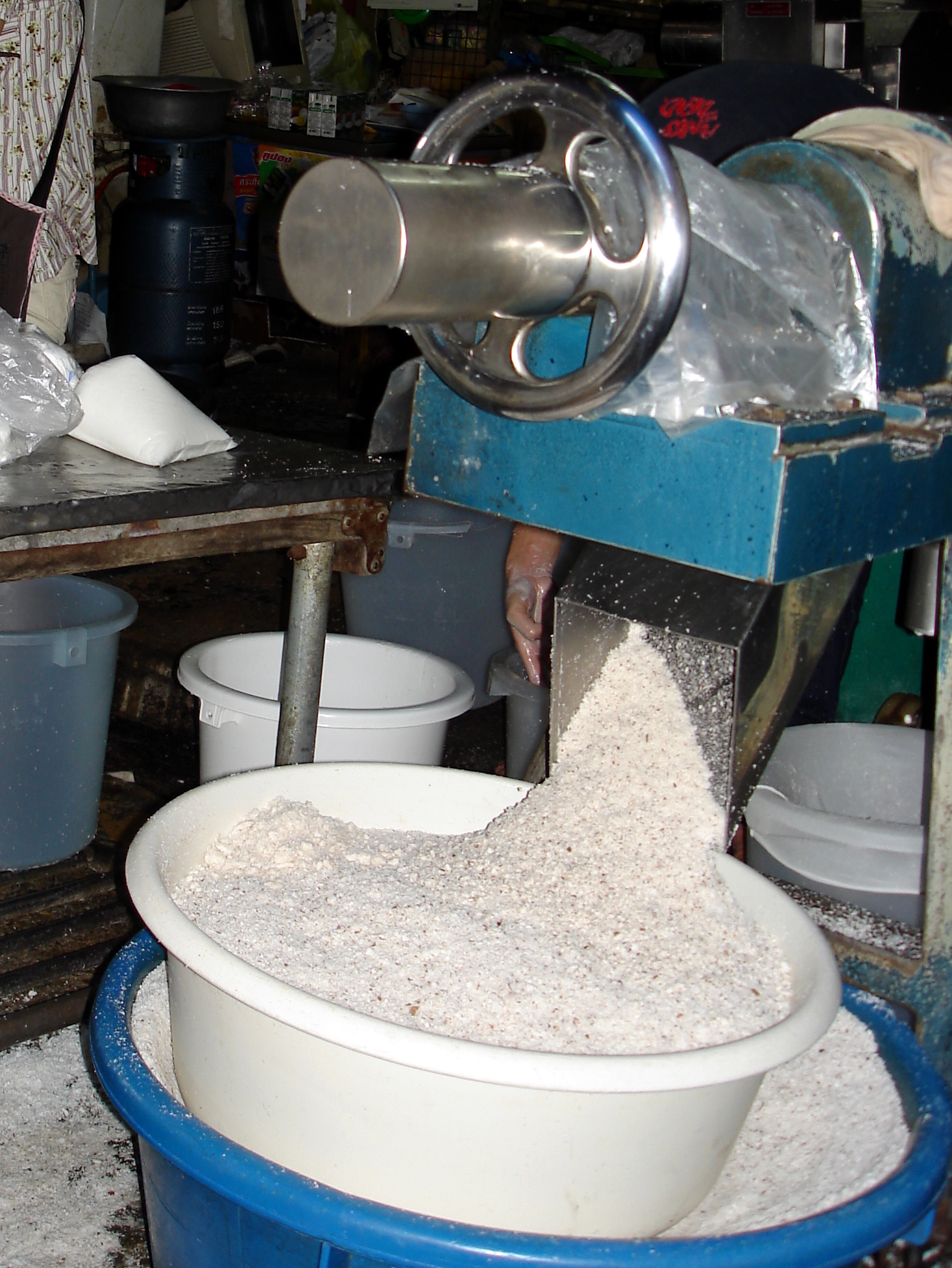
Mechanical coconut grinder

Commercially processed coconut milk products use largely the same processes to extract coconut milk from pulp, though they use more mechanical equipment like deshelling machines, grinders and pulverizers, motorized coconut shredders, and coconut milk extractors.

They differ significantly in the bottling or canning process, however. Processed coconut milk products are first filtered through a 100 mesh filters. They are pasteurized indirectly by double boiling at around 70 °C (158 °F), carefully not exceeding 80 °C (176 °F), the temperature at which coconut milk starts to coagulate. After pasteurization, they are immediately transferred to filling vessels and sealed before being cooled down. They are then packed into bottles, cans, or pouches and blast frozen for storage and transport.

Manufacturers of canned coconut milk typically combine diluted and comminuted milk with the addition of water as a filler. Depending on the brand and age of the milk itself, a thicker, more paste-like consistency floats to the top of the can (a gravity separation, similar to traditional methods), and is sometimes separated and used in recipes that require coconut cream rather than coconut milk. Some brands sold in Western countries undergo homogenization and contain additional thickening agents and emulsifiers to prevent the milk from separating inside the can.

Due to factors like pasteurization and minimal contact with oxygen, processed coconut milk generally has a longer shelf life than traditionally prepared coconut milk. It is also more efficient than traditional methods at extracting the maximum amount of coconut milk from grated coconut.

=== Coconut milk powder ===
Coconut cream can be dehydrated into coconut milk powder which has a far longer shelf life. It is produced by adding maltodextrin and casein to coconut cream to improve fluidity and then spray drying the mixture. The powder is packaged in moisture-proof containers. To use, water is simply added to the coconut milk powder.

=== Coconut skim milk ===
Coconut skim milk is coconut milk with very low levels of fat (0% to 1.5%). It is a byproduct of coconut cream and coconut oil production and is usually discarded. However, it is increasingly being used as a food ingredient for products which require coconut flavoring without the fats (including coconut powder, coconut honey, and coconut jam). It can also be used as a base in the production of coconut milk beverages used as milk substitutes, as it does not contain the high levels of fat characteristic of regular coconut milk while still being a good source of soluble proteins.

=== Milk substitutes ===
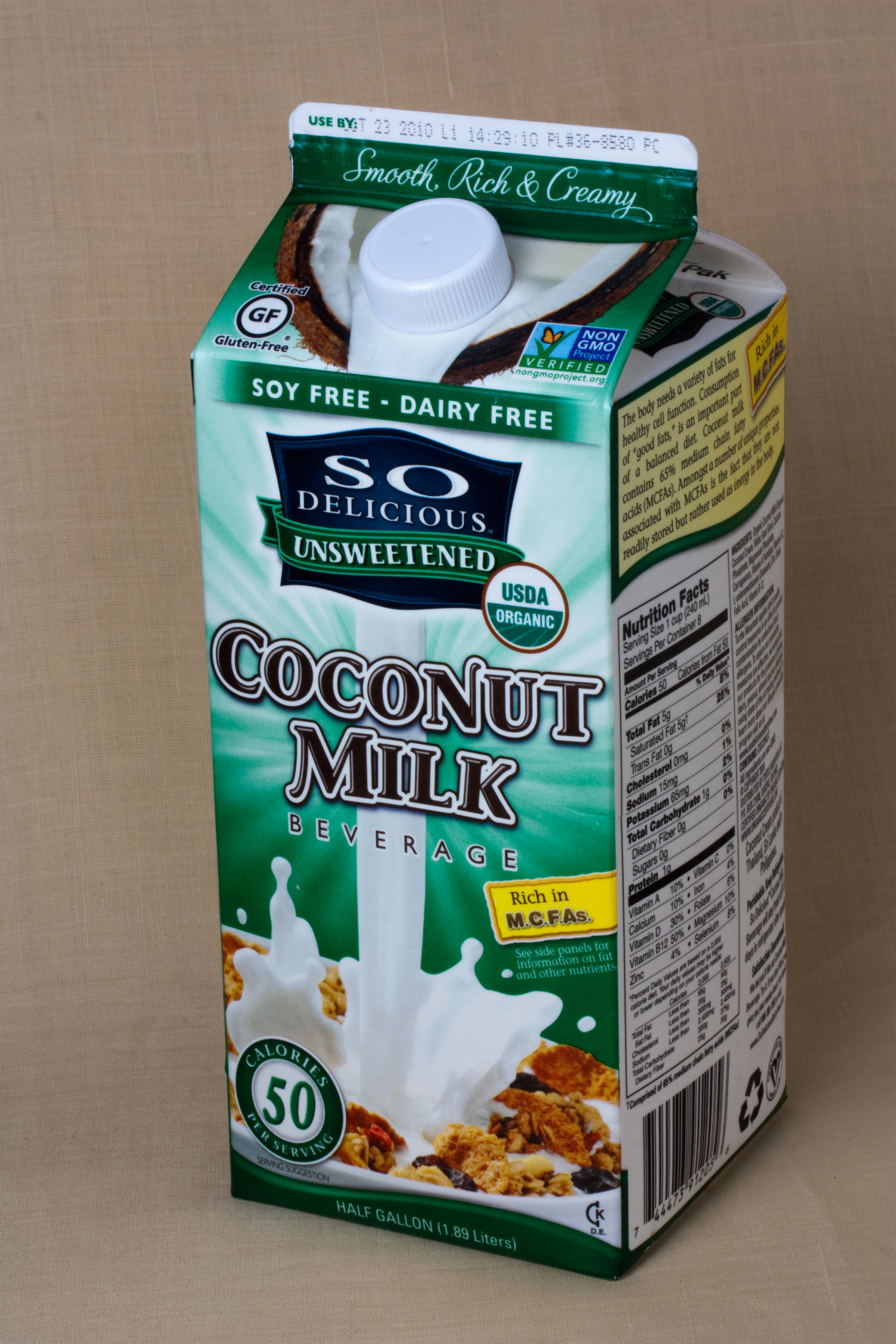
A carton of coconut milk beverage, a milk substitute

Processed coconut milk can be used as a substitute for milk beverages, usually marketed as "coconut milk beverage". They are sometimes confusingly also simply labeled as "coconut milk", though they are not the same product as coconut milk used for cooking (which is not meant for drinking). Milk substitutes from coconut are basically coconut milk diluted with water or coconut skim milk with additives. They contain less fat and fewer calories than milk, but also less protein. They contain high amounts of potassium and are good sources of fiber and iron. They are also commonly fortified with vitamin D and calcium.

=== Filled milk ===
Coconut milk is also used widely for filled milk products. It is blended with milk (usually skim milk or powdered milk) for its vegetable oils and proteins which act as substitutes for expensive butterfat in some processed milk products. They include low-fat filled milk, evaporated reconstituted milk, and sweetened condensed milk.

=== Cheese and custard production ===
Coconut milk can also be used in cheese and custard production, substituting at most 50% of milk without lowering the overall quality of the products. By mixing skim milk with coconut milk, one procedure develops cheeses – including a garlic-spiced soft cheese called queso de ajo, a Gouda cheese substitute, and a Roquefort substitute called "Niyoblue" (a portmanteau of Tagalog: niyog, "coconut", and "blue").

=== Soy milk enrichment ===
Coconut milk can be used to enrich the fat content of soy milk, improving its texture and taste to be closer to that of real milk. Coconut cream can also be added to soy milk in the production of tofu to enrich its caloric density without affecting its palatability.

=== Cream of coconut ===
Cream of coconut is a thick, heavily sweetened, processed coconut milk product resembling condensed milk. It was originally produced by the Puerto Rican company Coco López and is used most notably in piña coladas in the United States. It can also be used for other cocktail drinks and various desserts. It is distinct from coconut cream, and is not interchangeable.

== Cuisine ==
=== Coconut milk derivatives ===
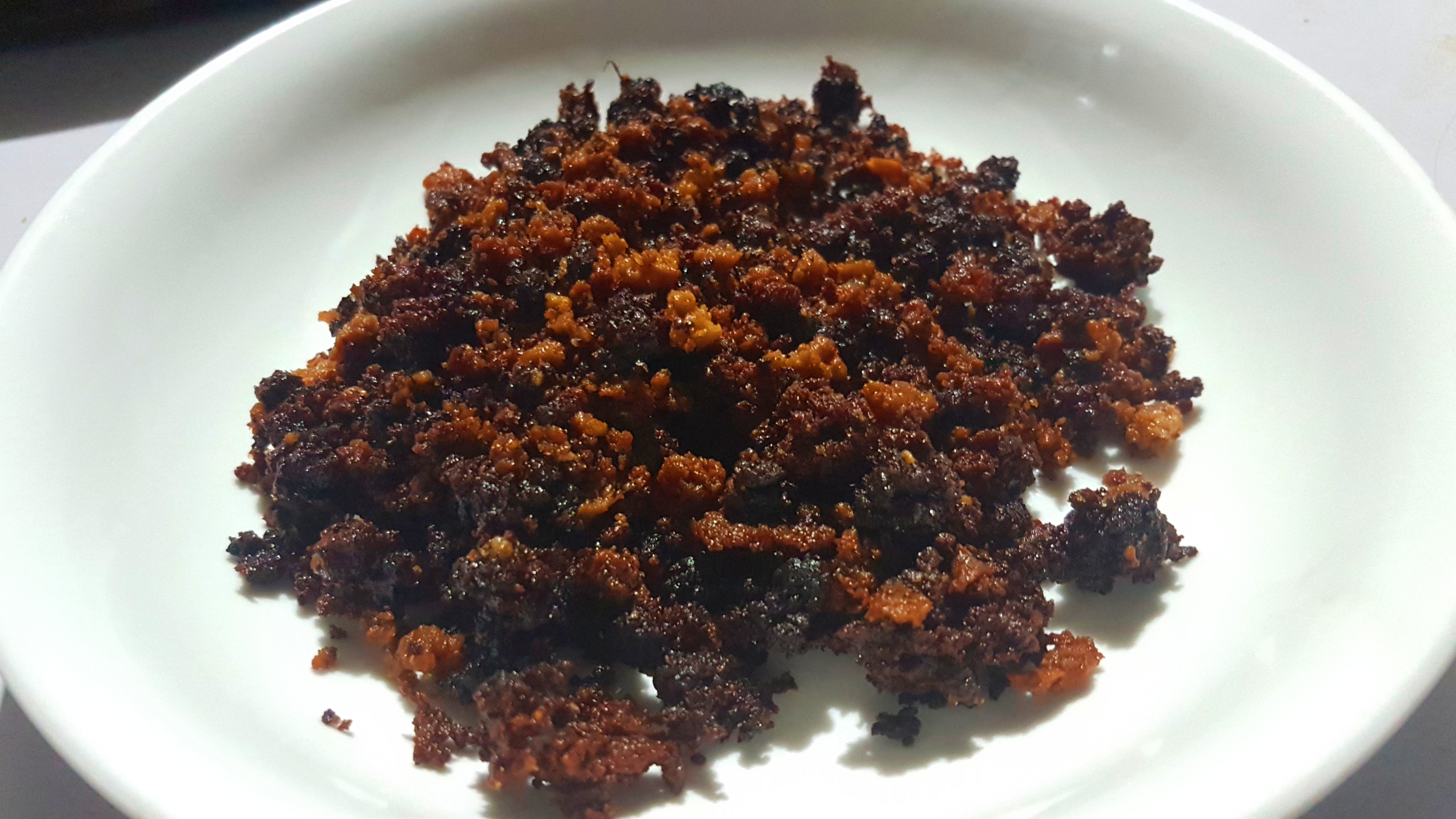
Coconut curd latik, a byproduct of traditional coconut oil production from simmered coconut milk

In the Philippines, coconut milk can also be further processed into coconut caramel and coconut curds, both known as latík. The coconut caramel latík made from a reduction of muscovado sugar and coconut milk has been developed into a commercial product marketed as coconut syrup (not to be confused with coconut sugar derived from coconut sap).

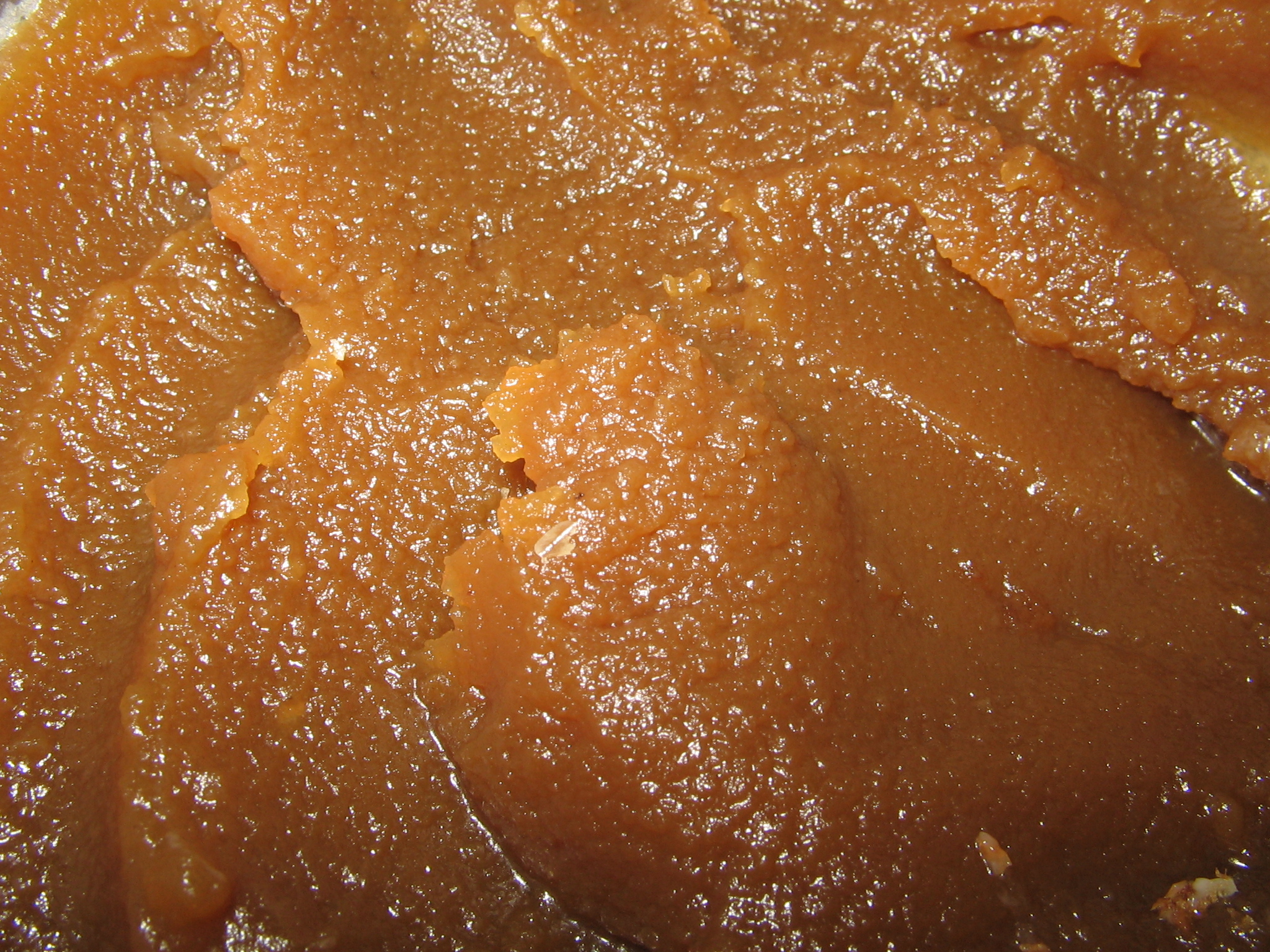
Kaya coconut jam, made with coconut milk, sugar, and eggs

A similar product found throughout Southeast Asia is coconut jam. It is known as matamís sa báo in the Philippines and uses only coconut milk and sugar. However, the coconut jam versions from Indonesia, Malaysia, and Singapore (kaya); Thailand (sangkhaya); Cambodia (sankiah); and Vietnam (banh gan), add eggs in addition to sugar. The latter versions are sometimes anglicized as "coconut custard" to distinguish them from the version without egg. Coconut jam and coconut custard have a thicker, jam-like consistency and are used as ingredients or fillings in various traditional desserts.

=== Food ===
Coconut milk can be used in both sweet and savory dishes. In many tropical and Asian cuisines, it is a traditional ingredient in curries and other dishes, including desserts.

==== Southeast Asia ====
In Indonesia, coconut milk is used in various recipes ranging from savoury dishes – such as rendang, soto, gulai, mie celor, sayur lodeh, gudeg, sambal goreng krechek, and opor ayam – to sweet desserts, such as serabi, es cendol and es doger. Soto is ubiquitous in Indonesia and considered one of Indonesia's national dishes. It is also used in coconut rice, a widespread Southeast Asian dish of rice cooked in coconut milk, including the nasi lemak of Malaysia and the nasi uduk of Indonesia.

In Malaysia, coconut milk is one of the essential ingredients in a lot of the dishes, this includes a few of the popular dishes in the region, such as the ubiquitous nasi lemak and nasi dagang, rendang, laksa, gulai and Tamil and Mamak style-curry, it is also used in dessert-making such as kuih lapis, kaya and dodol.

In the Philippines, diverse dishes cooked in coconut milk are called ginataán. They can range from savoury dishes to desserts. Coconut milk is widely used to make traditional Filipino kakanín (the generic term for rice pastries), including bibingka and biko, among others.

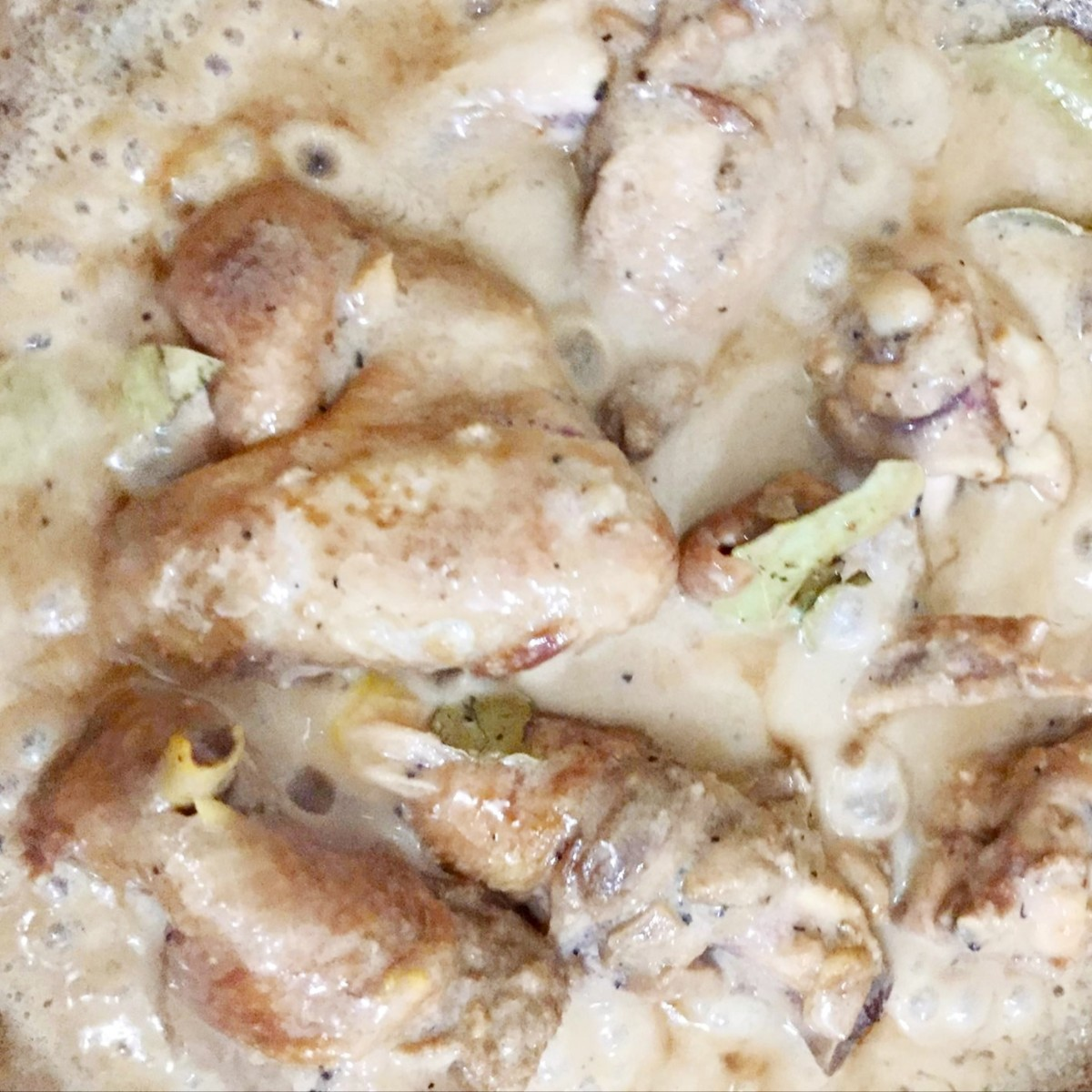
Adobong manók sa gatâ, a variant of chicken adobo with coconut milk

In Thailand, coconut milk is used in dishes such as tom kha kai, khao tom mat, mango sticky rice, and tom yum.

==== Latin America and the Caribbean ====
In Brazil, coconut milk is mostly used in northeastern cuisine, generally with seafood stews and desserts. In Venezuela, pulp dishes are prepared with coconut milk and shredded fish in a dish called mojito en coco. In Colombia and Panama, the grated flesh of coconut and coconut milk are used to make sweet titoté, a key ingredient in making arroz con coco (coconut rice).

Coconut milk is used to make traditional Venezuelan dishes, such as majarete (a typical Venezuelan dessert), and arroz con coco (the Venezuelan version of coconut rice).

=== Drink ===
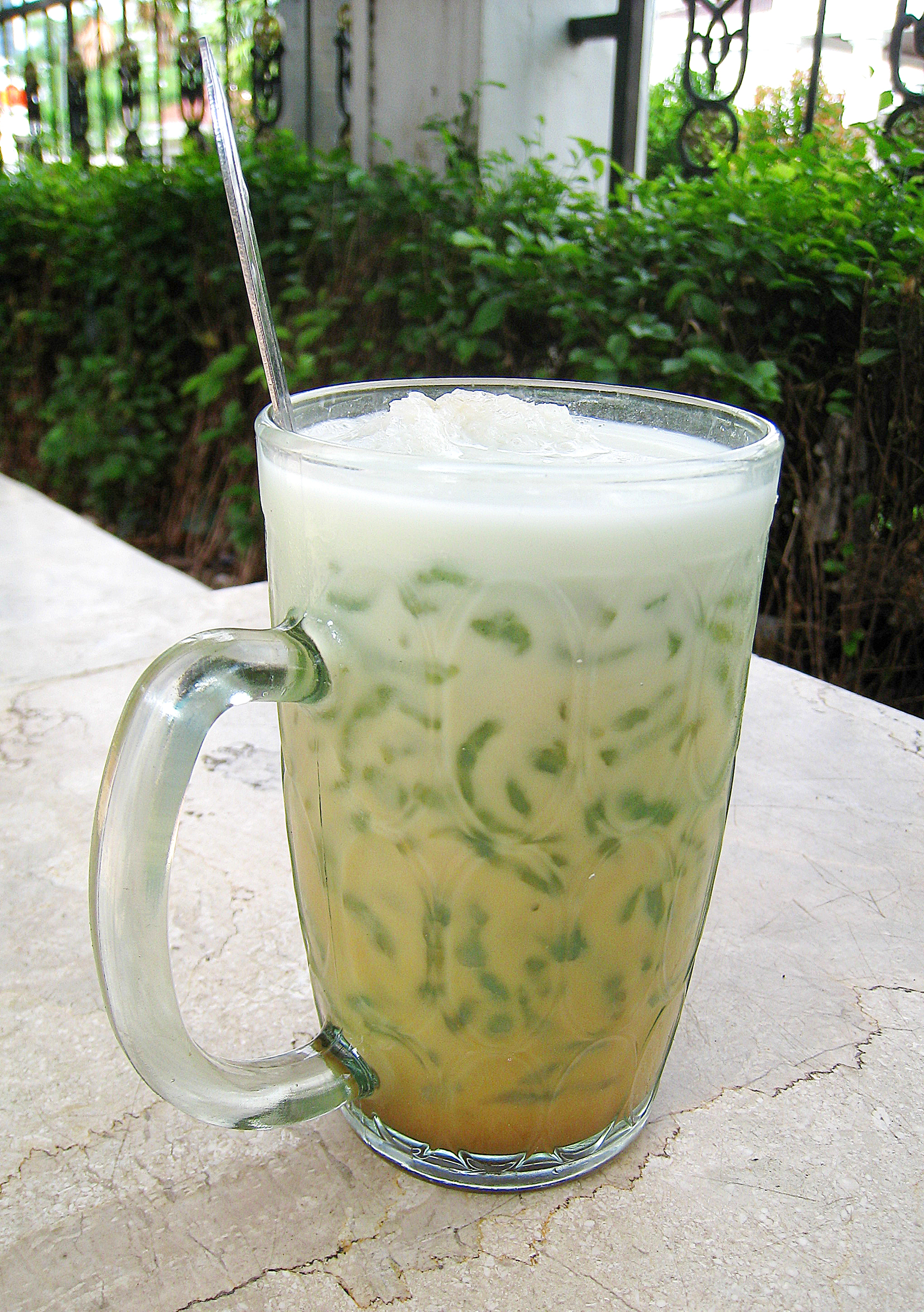
Cendol, a green jelly drink with iced coconut milk and palm sugar

In Southeast Asia, coconut milk is used to make many traditional drinks. Cendol is a popular iced drink from this region containing chilled coconut milk and green jellies made of rice flour. Coconut milk is also used in hot drinks such as bandrek and bajigur, two popular drinks from Indonesia. Aside from this, coconut milk is also an optional pairing with coffee in various countries of the region notably Vietnam (as cà phê dừa) plus Malaysia and Indonesia (as kopi santan).

Sweetened coconut milk, and coconut milk diluted with water are two popular coconut beverages in southern China and Taiwan. As coconut milk becomes more popular in China, the sweetened coconut milk market is growing rapidly and is likely to reach 22.4 billion yuan (equal to about USD 3.14 billion) by 2026.

The jelly-like pulp from the inside of the coconut is often added to coconut water to make a tropical drink. In Brazil, for example, coconut milk is mixed with sugar and cachaça to make a cocktail called batida de côco. Puerto Rico is also popular for tropical drinks containing coconut, such as piña colada and coquito, which typically contain coconut milk or coconut cream.

== Saturated fat and health risk ==
One of the most prominent components of coconut milk is coconut oil, which many health organizations (Note: The United States Food and Drug Administration, World Health Organization, International College of Nutrition, the United States Department of Health and Human Services, American Dietetic Association, American Heart Association, British National Health Service, and Dietitians of Canada) discourage people from consuming in significant amounts due to its high levels of saturated fat. Excessive coconut milk consumption can also raise blood levels of cholesterol due to the amount of lauric acid, a saturated fat that contributes to higher blood cholesterol.

== Horticulture ==
In 1943, it was discovered that coconut milk could actively encourage plant growth. Although there are many factors that attribute coconut milk to plant growth, the main cause is the existence of a cytokinin known as zeatin found in coconut milk. While the zeatin in coconut milk speeds up plant growth in general, it does not speed up growth in certain plants such as radishes. However, when 10% coconut milk is added to the substrate on which wheat is grown, substantial improvements have been noted.

== Commerce ==
Coconuts are widely produced in tropical climates and exported globally as canned products, most frequently to North America and Europe.

In China, coconut milk has become so popular that companies have to import coconuts from neighboring countries to meet the rising domestic demand. This has pushed domestic companies to explore more coconut product categories to capture market attention. Based on a market research study conducted by the LeadLeo Research Institute, China’s coconut-based beverage market rose from $1.5 billion to about $2.0 billion between 2017 and 2020, representing a compound annual growth rate of about 7%.

== See also ==
- Creamed coconut
- Ginataan
- List of dishes using coconut milk
- Plant milk
