= Cocoșești =

Cocoşeşti may refer to several villages in Romania:

- Cocoşeşti, a village in Avram Iancu, Alba
- Cocoşeşti, a village in Păulești, Prahova, ctitorit de familia Savu

== See also ==
- Cocoș River (disambiguation)
- Cocoșul River (disambiguation)
