= Periconiella =

Scientific classification
- Kingdom: Fungi
- Division: Ascomycota
- Class: incertae sedis
- Order: incertae sedis
- Family: incertae sedis
- Genus: Periconiella; Sacc.

Type species
- Periconiella velutina (G. Winter) Sacc.

Genus of fungi

Periconiella is a genus of ascomycete fungi. It was defined by the Italian mycologist Pier Andrea Saccardo in 1885. Periconiella includes around 60 species. Periconiella cocoes is one of them.
