= Asian and Pacific Coconut Community =

Intergovernmental organisation

The Asian and Pacific Coconut Community (APCC or Cocommunity) is an intergovernmental organisation of states in Asia-Pacific that produce coconuts (Cocos nucifera L.). Coconuts are native to humid regions, specifically, between latitudes 26° N and 26° S of the equator. The purpose of the APCC is "to promote, coordinate and harmonize all activities of the coconut industry". The coconut industry is vital because the coconut plant itself is versatile, providing income, household products, and a lot of food. For example, coconut provides income for 11 million small farm-holders worldwide and is responsible for the production of ca. 61,165 million nuts every year. With such productivity and usefulness, coconuts are a source of economic development for many tropical countries across the globe. For further coconut uses, see Coconut (disambiguation).

As mentioned above, the APCC is important as it facilitates the effective trading of coconuts in Asia-Pacific countries. As the global supply and demand for coconuts and coconut-based products increase, the relevance of APCC is apparent. The coconut industry is gradually becoming the foundation of some countries' economies.

In Bangkok on 12 December 1968, the Agreement establishing the Asian Coconut Community was concluded and signed by India, Indonesia, and the Philippines. After these states ratified the treaty, the Asian Coconut Community came into existence on 9 September 1969 with headquarters in Jakarta. When states outside Asia began to be admitted to the organisation, its name was changed to the "Asian and Pacific Coconut Community". Moreover, the APCC was formed as under the support of the United Nations Economic and Social Commission for Asia and the Pacific (UN-ESCAP). In total, 18 countries are members of APCC. The countries include Fiji, Kiribati, India, Indonesia, Federal States of Micronesia, Marchall Islands, Malaysia, Philippines, Papua New Guinea, Sri Lanka, Solomon Islands, Vanuatu, Kenya, Thailand, Tonga, Jamaica, and Vietnam. Kenya and Jamaica are associate members.

The member states of the APCC account for over 90 per cent of the world's coconut production and coconut exports. Member states of the APCC and the dates they joined are as follows (an asterisk indicates that the state has ratified the original 1968 Agreement):

- Fiji
- India* (1969)
- Indonesia* (1969)
- Jamaica* (2011, associate member)
- Kenya (associate member)
- Kiribati* (2004)
- Malaysia* (1972)
- Marshall Islands* (2004)
- Federated States of Micronesia* (2004)
- Papua New Guinea* (1976)
- Philippines* (1969)
- Samoa* (1972)
- Solomon Islands
- Sri Lanka* (1969)
- Thailand (1972)
- Tonga
- Vanuatu
- Vietnam* (2004)

Coconut Pests and Diseases Research

Other than trade, the APCC is also involved in research. Coconut rhinoceros beetle (CRB: Oryctes rhinoceros L.) is considered the most common and major pest for coconuts. It was first discovered in Samoa but soon spread to other countries with the Pacific and Indian Oceans. This pest is very destructive it extremely damages coconut palms and therefore, diminishes people's livelihoods. The Pacific Community thus took the step of community engagement as a tool to prevent Oryctes rhinoceros L invasion. Approximately 60% of Pacific Islanders' livelihood is destroyed by Oryctes rhinoceros L annually. This necessitates the need for further research and community collaborations to come up with effective solutions.

Bottom Line

The growth of the coconut industry in Asia and Pacific regions boosts local economies and opens up new opportunities for innovation in coconut-based products. With the rise of sustainable practices and the increasing consumer interest in natural products, the APCC's role in fostering regional cooperation and sustainability in coconut farming is becoming even more crucial. Moreover, as climate change presents new challenges to agriculture, the APCC's efforts in research and development can help ensure the resilience and continued success of the coconut industry in the region.

== Executive directors ==
1. G. P. Reyes (1969–85)
2. P. G. Punchihewa (1985–2000)
3. Norberto Boceta (2000–01)
4. P. Rethinam (2002–05)
5. Romulo N. Arancon, Jr. (2006–13)
6. Uron N. Salum (2013–Date)
