= Periconiella cocoes =

Scientific classification
- Kingdom: Fungi
- Division: Ascomycota
- Class: incertae sedis
- Order: incertae sedis
- Family: incertae sedis
- Genus: Periconiella
- Species: P. cocoes

Binomial name
- Periconiella cocoes M.B. Ellis (1967)

Species of fungus

Periconiella cocoes is an ascomycete fungus that is a plant pathogen affecting the coconut.

== See also ==
- List of coconut palm diseases
