= Marasmiellus cocophilus =

Scientific classification
- Kingdom: Fungi
- Division: Basidiomycota
- Class: Agaricomycetes
- Order: Agaricales
- Family: Omphalotaceae
- Genus: Marasmiellus
- Species: M. cocophilus

Binomial name
- Marasmiellus cocophilus Pegler (1969)

Species of fungus

Marasmiellus cocophilus is a species of fungus in the family Marasmiaceae. It was described as new to science in 1969 by mycologist David Pegler. The fungus causes lethal bole rot of coconut.
