= Coconut Island =

Coconut Island may refer to:

- Coconut Island (Florida)
- Coconut Island (Hawaiʻi County), in Hilo Bay
- Coconut Island (Honolulu County), in Kaneohe Bay
- Coconut Island (Queensland)
- another name for St. Martin's Island, Bangladesh

== See also ==
- Cocos Island (disambiguation)
- Aldabra, coral atoll containing the islands of North Coconut and South Coconut
- Diamond coconut model, hypothetical island economy based on trade in coconuts
