= Cocos Island (disambiguation) =

Cocos Island or Coco Island may refer to:

== Cocos ==
- Cocos Island (Spanish: Isla del Coco), in the Pacific Ocean, administered by Costa Rica
- Cocos Island, in the Pearl Islands group, off the Pacific coast of Panama
- Cocos (Keeling) Islands, a territory of Australia in the Indian Ocean
- Cocos Island (Guam), off Guam in the western Pacific Ocean
- Île aux Cocos ('Cocos Island'), off Rodrigues, Mauritius
- Cocos Islands, Seychelles (French: Îles aux Cocos), in the Indian Ocean

== Coco ==
- Coco Islands, in the Indian Ocean, part of the Yangon Region of Myanmar
- Cayo Coco, Cuba
- CocoCay, or Little Stirrup Cay, Bahamas
- L'Île Coco ('Coco Island'), in the St. Brandon archipelago of Mauritius, in the Indian Ocean

== See also ==
- Caicos Islands, in Turks and Caicos Islands
- Coconut Island (disambiguation)
- Shire of Cocos (Keeling) Islands, which governs the Cocos (Keeling) Islands
