= Coconut (disambiguation) =

Coconut is the coconut palm tree (Cocos nucifera), its fruit, or the seed within its fruit.

Coconut may also refer to:

== Music ==
- Señor Coconut, stage name of Uwe Schmidt (born 1968), German composer, musician and producer of electronic music
- Coconut Records (record label), a German record label
- Coconut Records (musician), a Jason Schwartzman indie-pop project

=== Albums ===
- Coconut (Archie Bronson Outfit album), 2010
- Coconut (NiziU album), 2023
- Coconuts (album), 2005, by Jane

=== Songs ===
- "Coconut" (Harry Nilsson song), 1971
- "Coconut" (NiziU song), 2023
- "Coconut", a 1995 instrumental song by Raffi from his Raffi Radio album
- "Coconuts" (song), 2021, by Kim Petras

== Film, stage, and television ==
- The Cocoanuts (musical), 1925
  - The Cocoanuts (1929), a Marx Brothers film based on the musical
- Cocoanut (film), a 1939 French-German comedy drama film
- Coconuts, a character from the Adventures of Sonic the Hedgehog animated series
- "Coconuts" (Foster's Home for Imaginary Friends), a 2007 short cartoon

== Other uses ==
- Cool Companions on Ultrawide Orbits (COCONUTS), a large-scale survey
- Coconut (slur), a pejorative for a person deemed brown on the outside but white on the inside
- Coconuts, Queensland, a locality in the Cassowary Coast Region, Australia
- Coconuts Media, an Asian multinational media company
- Coconut (satellite), a CubeSat developed by Arizona State University
- Coconuts (video game), a 1982 video game released for the Atari 2600 by Telesys

== See also ==
- Mr. Coconut
- COCONUT98, a block cryptographic cipher
- Coconut Tree (disambiguation)
- Coconut Island (disambiguation)
