= Stigmina palmivora =

Scientific classification
- Kingdom: Fungi
- Division: Ascomycota
- Class: Dothideomycetes
- Order: Capnodiales
- Family: Mycosphaerellaceae
- Genus: Stigmina
- Species: S. palmivora

Binomial name
- Stigmina palmivora (Sacc.) S. Hughes, Mycol. Pap. 49: 13 (1952)

Synonyms
- Cercospora palmivora (Sacc.) Nann., (1928); Cercospora preisii Bubák, (1903); Exosporium palmivorum Sacc., (1898); Exosporium preisii Bubák, (1904); Sciniatosporium palmivorum (Sacc.) Morgan-Jones, (1971)

Species of fungus

Stigmina palmivora is a plant pathogen infecting coconut palms.
