= Coconut Tree =

The coconut tree is a member of the palm tree family.

Coconut Tree may also refer to any of the songs:

- "Coconut Tree" (song) (2011), by Mohombi
- "Coconut Tree" (1969), by The Humblebums
- "Coconut Tree" (1974), by Gerry Rafferty from his album Gerry Rafferty
- "Coconut Tree" (1989), by Brendan Croker and The 5 O'Clock Shadows
- "Coconut Tree" (2013), by Kenny Chesney (with Willie Nelson), from his album Life on a Rock
- "Coconut Tree" (2017), from Shakira's album El Dorado

== See also ==
- "You think you just fell out of a coconut tree?", a quip by Kamala Harris
