= Corticium penicillatum =

Scientific classification
- Kingdom: Fungi
- Division: Basidiomycota
- Class: Agaricomycetes
- Order: Corticiales
- Family: Corticiaceae
- Genus: Corticium
- Species: C. penicillatum

Binomial name
- Corticium penicillatum Petch (1925)

Species of fungus

Corticium penicillatum is a species of fungus in the class Agaricomycetes. It is a corticioid fungus and a plant pathogen, the causal agent of coconut thread blight, a leaf disease of coconut palms. The species was originally described from Papua New Guinea in 1925 and has since been reported from Vanuatu, Fiji, and the Solomon Islands. Corticium penicillatum has never been redescribed or reviewed and is unlikely to be a species of Corticium in the modern sense.
