= Coconut Island (Florida) =

Island in Florida, United States

- Coconut Island Coconut Island (Florida) (the Caribbean)

Geography
- Location: Gulf of Mexico
- Coordinates: 25°58′16″N 81°44′44″W

Administration
- United States
- State: Florida
- County: Collier

Coconut island was a river island in the mouth of the Marco River in Collier County, Florida.

== Part of Sea Oat Island ==
Coconut island was created in 1960 when Hurricane Donna carved a path through the southern tip of Sea Oat Island, isolating a portion of land that came to be known as Coconut Island. The island was about 650 feet long and 400 feet wide at its widest point.

== Island distraction ==
With the opening of Capri Pass in 1967, the island began experiencing rapid erosion, shrinking to 10% of its size by 1990. By 2005 Coconut Island existed as no more than a sandbar. Coconut Island used to block the entrance into the Marco River and boaters had to divert around Coconut to get out into the Gulf. The island was thick with trees, had beaches all around the perimeter and was home to nesting Bald Eagles and several species of seabirds. Coconut became a weekend haven for Marco islanders and Naples boaters and offered magnificent shelling, great fishing and ample camping and picnic areas. Between Coconut and Hideaway Beach was a tremendous anchorage for locals and cruising boaters. Nearly two years after Hurricane Andrew came through this area in August 1992, Collier County mapping department informed Coconut Island taxpayers that Coconut Island had sunk due to the hurricane's aftermath. Island taxpayers who refused to pay taxes on sunken land (not technically taxable and not technically land) that had no value were contacted by the Rookery Bay Estuarian Reserve asking if they would donate their lost parcels to the Estuarian Reserve. As erosion had its way, the island started to recede slowly. But nature was not the only culprit in the death of this barrier island. In the late 1990s, the Rookery Bay National Estuarine Research Reserve removed all the trees on Coconut, claiming the non-native trees were suffocating the natural foliage. With no trees to protect the sand from wind and water erosion, the island started to disappear rapidly. Each week there was less and less beachfront. The final blow came in 2005 when dredging equipment, used for the beach re-nourishment project on the mainland, altered the flow and natural currents. Coconut Island was gone in a few weeks.

== Island reemergence ==
In 2011, with the ever-changing currents and coastline, a new island emerged. Rookery Bay has roped off an area of this island for nesting seabirds, leaving the perimeter beaches for picnics, shelling and fishing. Once again, there is a protected anchorage for traveling boats and a weekend destination for all to enjoy.
