= Cocoș Monastery =

Monastery in Romania

Coordinates: 45°12′42″N 28°24′56″E

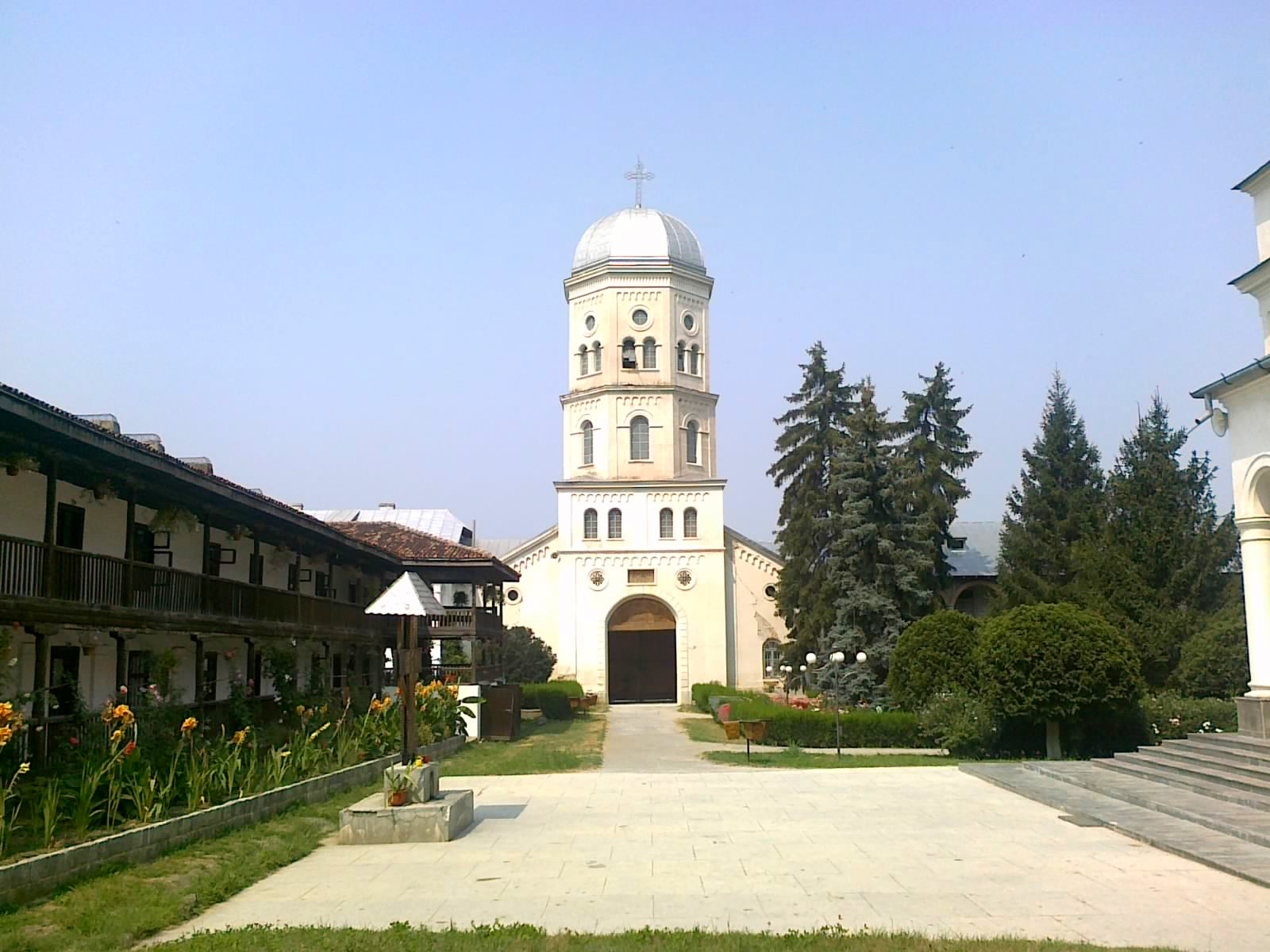
Cocoș Monastery

Cocoş Monastery is a monastery in Romania, located in a forest clearing 6 km (3.7 mi) south of the town Niculițel.

The place name is due to the cocoș de mesteacăn, the Romanian name for birch cock or black grouse (Lyrurus tetrix), a wild bird frequently sighted in the woods.

The first religious building on the site was a hermitage, first referred in 1679. The monastery was founded in 1833 by three Moldovan monks from Neamț, on the way to Mount Athos.

The monastery includes an abbot's house, a number of monks' dwellings, a bell tower, a chapel and a church dedicated to the Dormition of the Theotokos, all of which are on the list of historical monuments in Romania, being built between 1883 and 1913.

In 1971, nearby, heavy rains exposed the dome of an old hidden crypt with the remains of four 3C martyrs (Zotikos, Attalos, Kamasis and Phillipos); their relics were later placed in caskets and brought to the monastery, and started attracting many pilgrims.

== Gallery ==
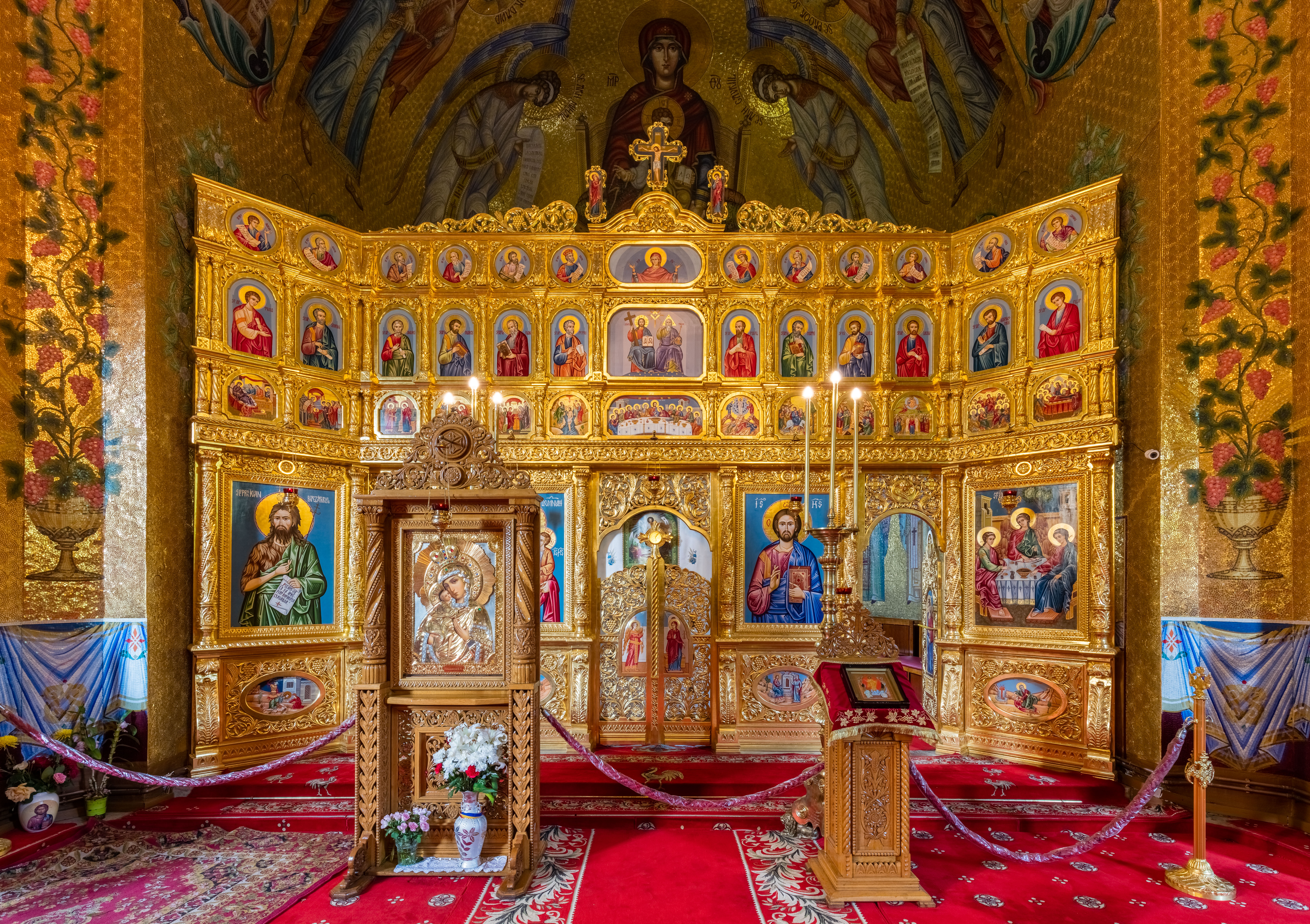
The High Altar

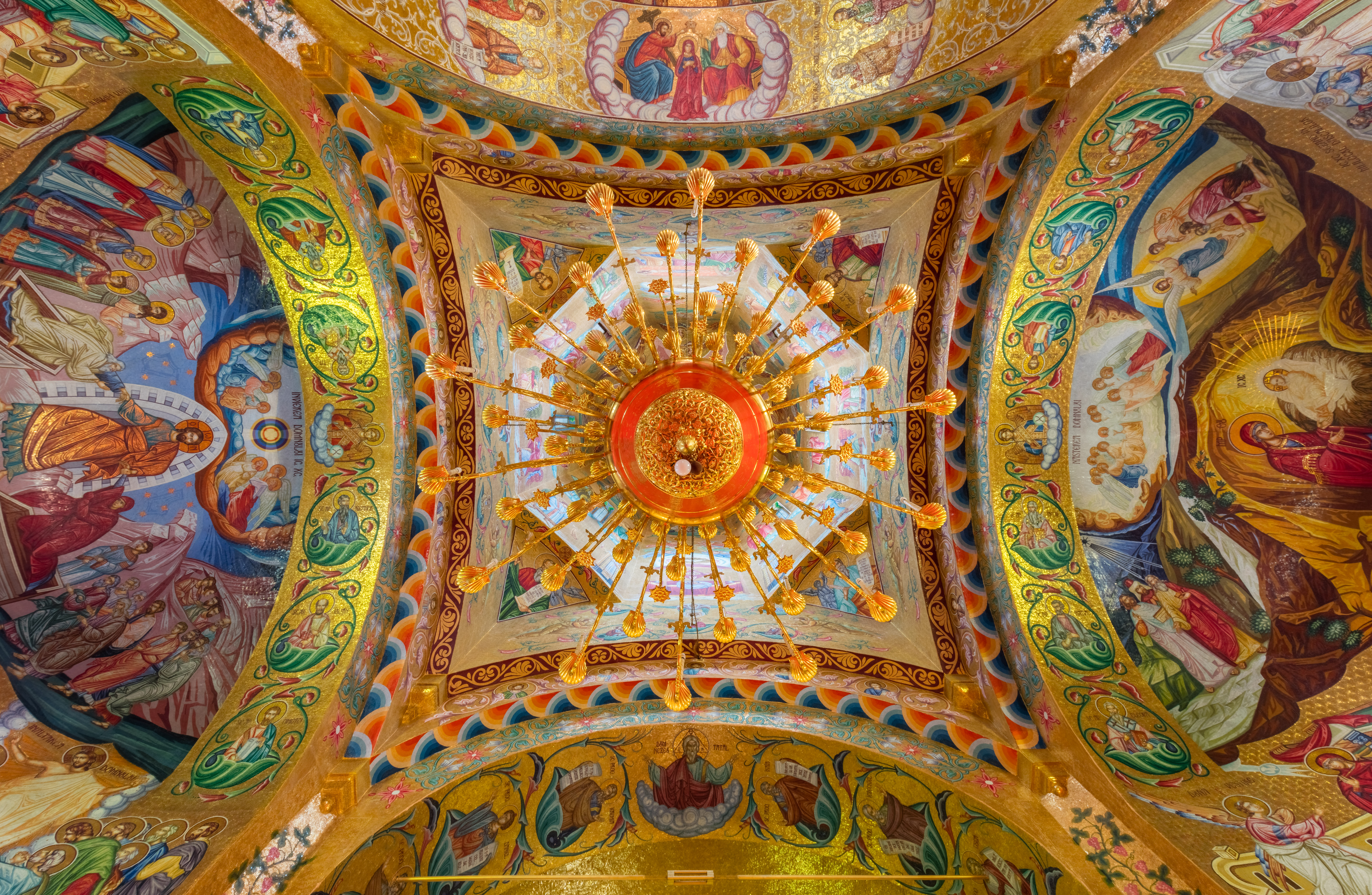
Church ceiling

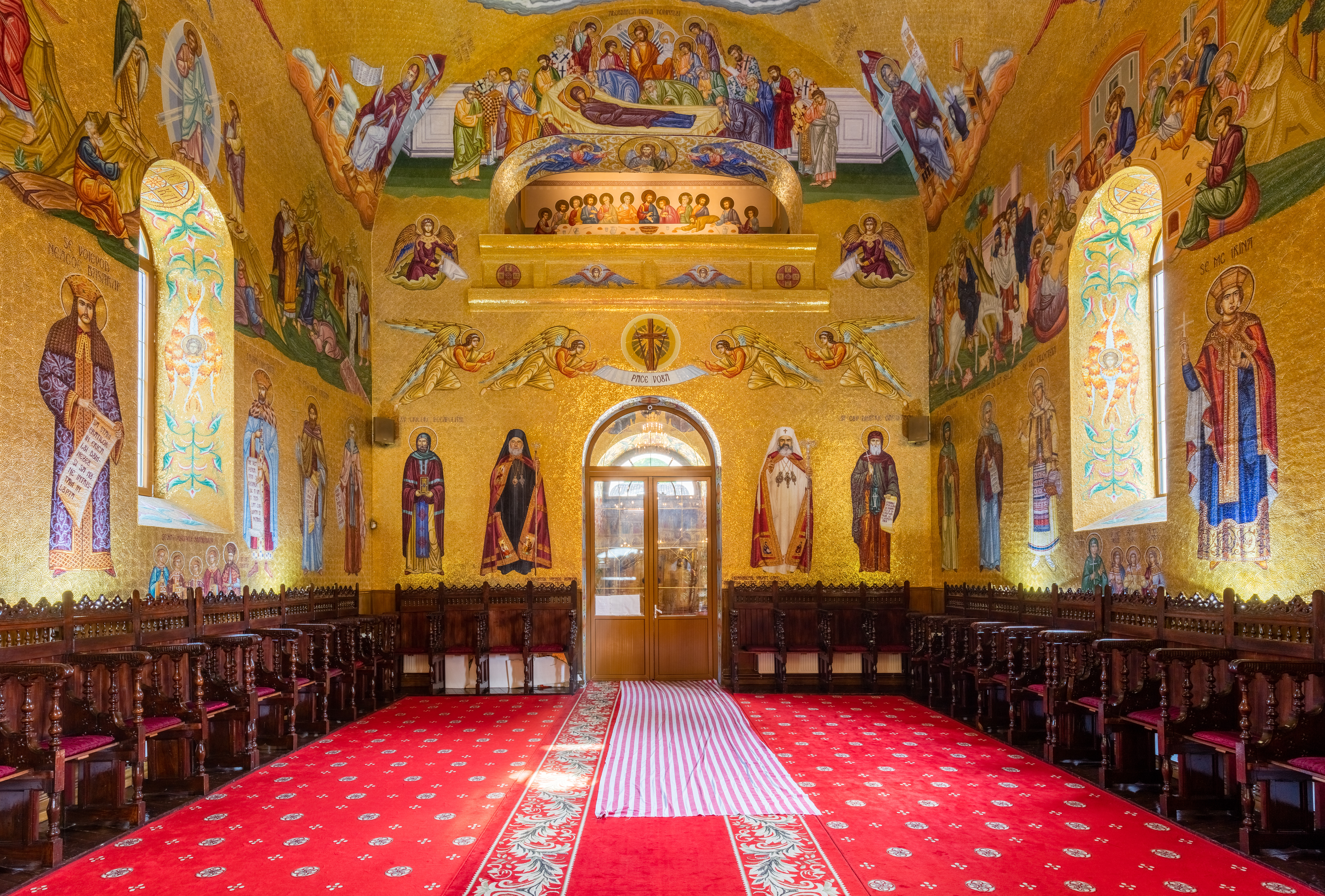
Entrance view of the church

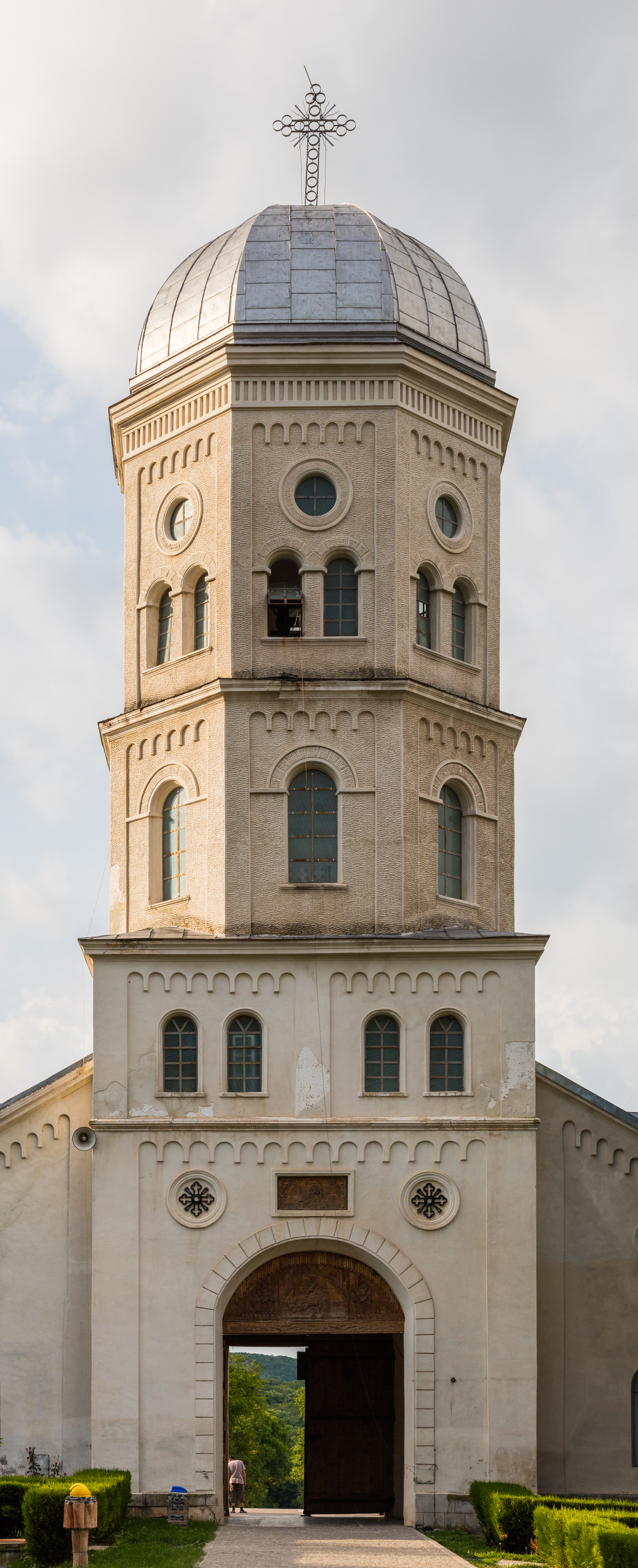
Entrance to the monastery

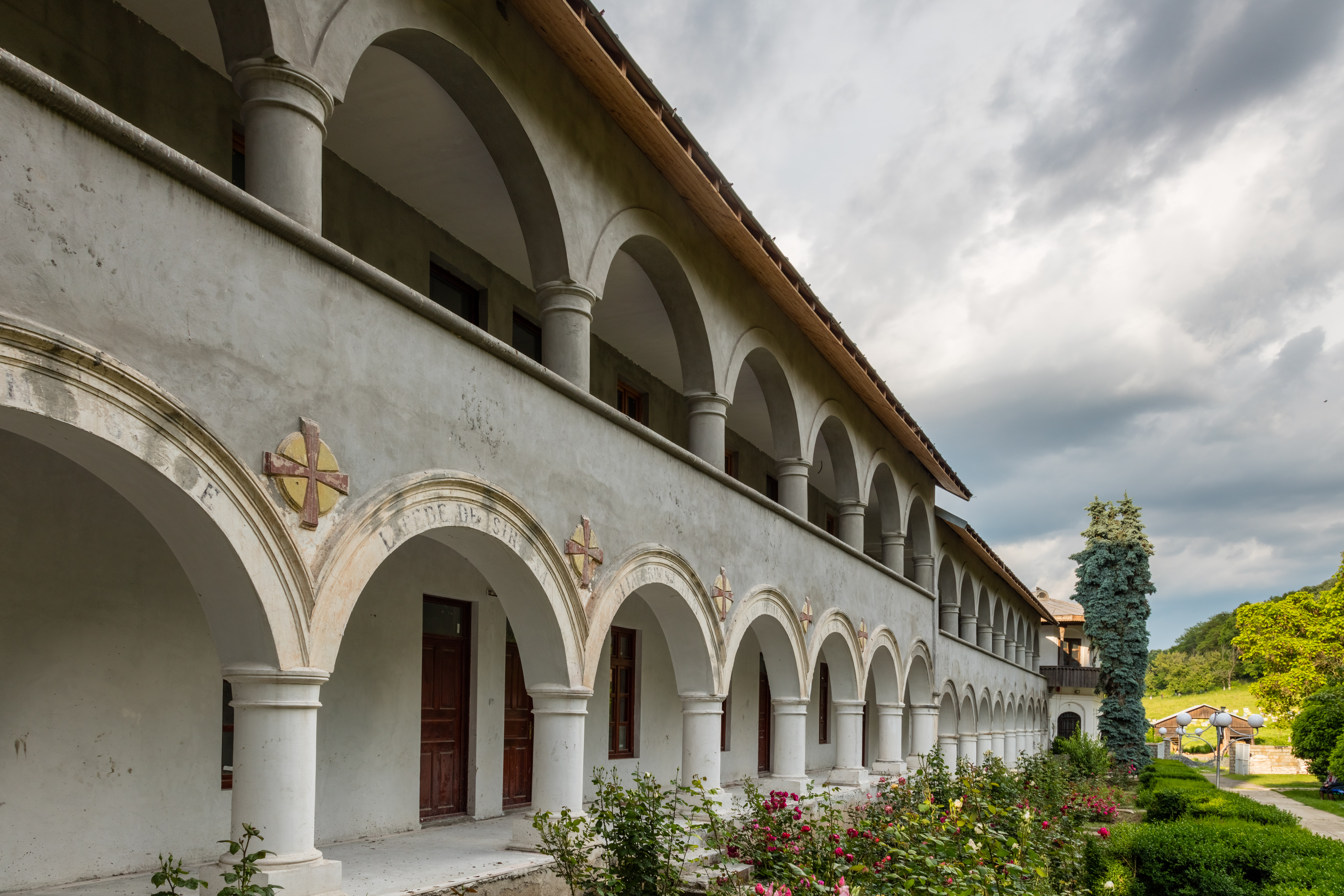
Monks' housing
