= Capitorostrum cocoes =

Scientific classification
- Kingdom: Fungi
- Division: Ascomycota
- Class: incertae sedis
- Order: incertae sedis
- Family: incertae sedis
- Genus: Capitorostrum
- Species: C. cocoes

Binomial name
- Capitorostrum cocoes K.D. Hyde & Philemon, (1991)

Species of fungus

Capitorostrum cocoes is an ascomycete fungus that is a plant pathogen.
