= Île aux Cocos =

Island of Mauritius

Coordinates: 19°43′10″S 63°18′00″E

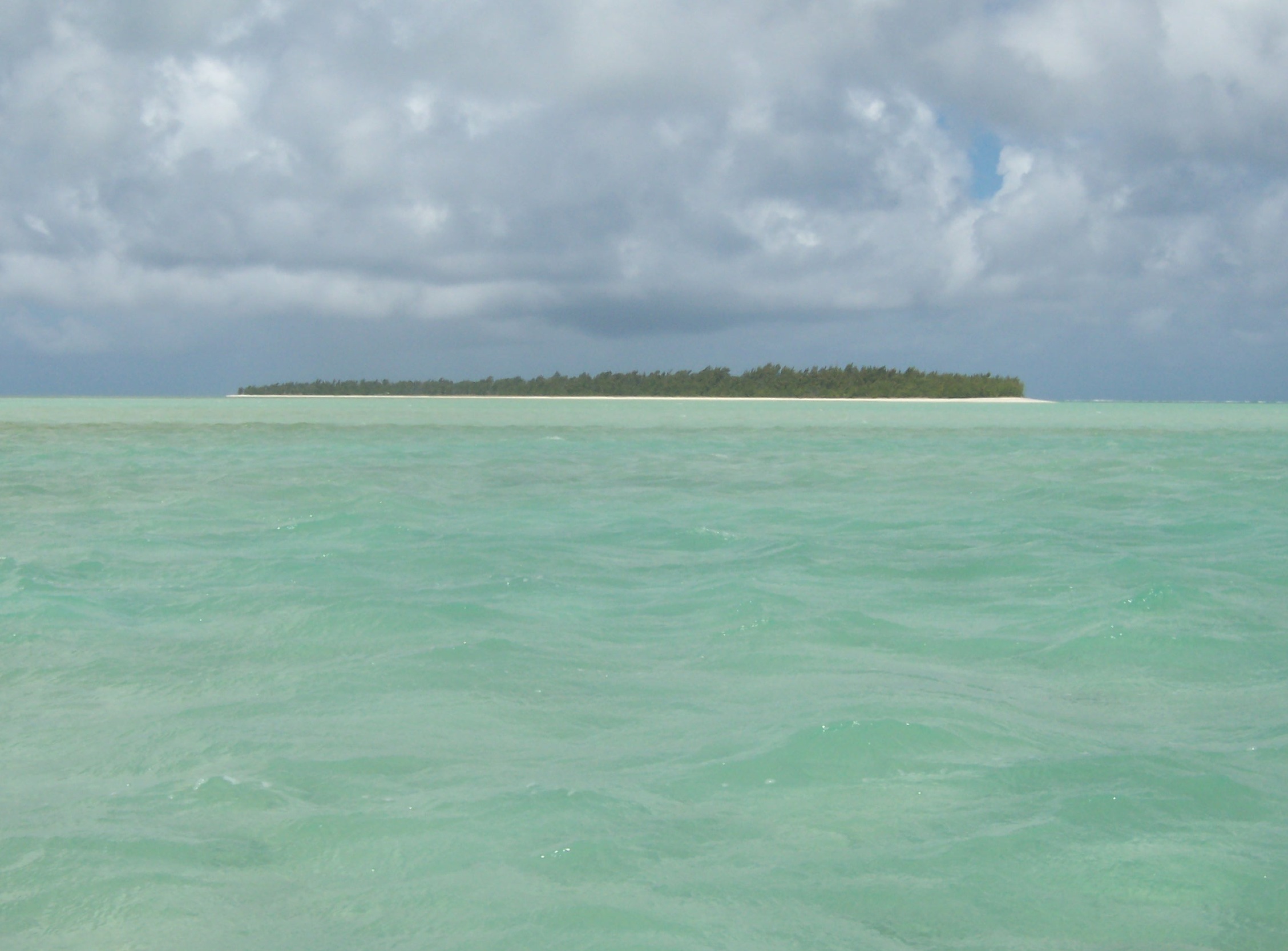
Île aux Cocos

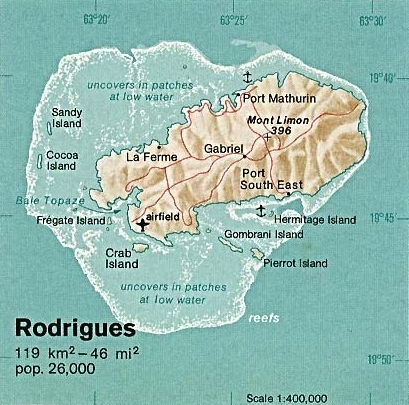
Île aux Cocos (misspelled "Cocoa Island") on map of Rodrigues

Île aux Cocos (French pronunciation: [il o koko]; 'Cocos Island') is a small uninhabited island lying four kilometres west of Rodrigues in the Indian Ocean. It is a nature reserve known for its seabird colonies. The island is not accessible to the public except via guided visits to the island. The southern tip delineated by wooden posts is closed to visitors to protect the bird population.

== Birds ==
The following birds are commonly found on Île aux Cocos and the neighbouring, but smaller, Île aux Sables:

- Breeding seabirds
  - Common or brown noddy
  - Lesser noddy
  - Sooty tern
  - Fairy tern
  - Roseate tern
- Migratory birds
  - Ruddy Turnstone
  - Curlew Sandpiper
  - Crab-plover
  - Whimbrel
