= Pseudoepicoccum cocos =

Scientific classification
- Kingdom: Fungi
- Division: Ascomycota
- Class: Dothideomycetes
- Order: Capnodiales
- Family: incertae sedis
- Genus: Pseudoepicoccum
- Species: P. cocos

Binomial name
- Pseudoepicoccum cocos (F. Stevens) M.B. Ellis (1971)

Species of fungus

Pseudoepicoccum cocos is an ascomycete fungus that is a plant pathogen infecting coconut palms. It was recorded in Australia in 1992.
