= Macrosporium cocos =

Scientific classification
- Domain: Eukaryota
- Kingdom: Fungi
- Division: Ascomycota
- Class: Dothideomycetes
- Order: Pleosporales
- Family: Pleosporaceae
- Genus: Macrosporium
- Species: M. cocos

Binomial name
- Macrosporium cocos Pass.

Species of fungus

Macrosporium cocos is a plant pathogen.
