= Cedar rust =

Cedar rust may refer to:

- Gymnosporangium juniperi-virginianae, or Cedar-apple rust
- Gymnosporangium clavipes, or Cedar-quince rust
- Gymnosporangium globosum, or Cedar-hawthorn rust

== See also ==
- Miller v. Schoene
