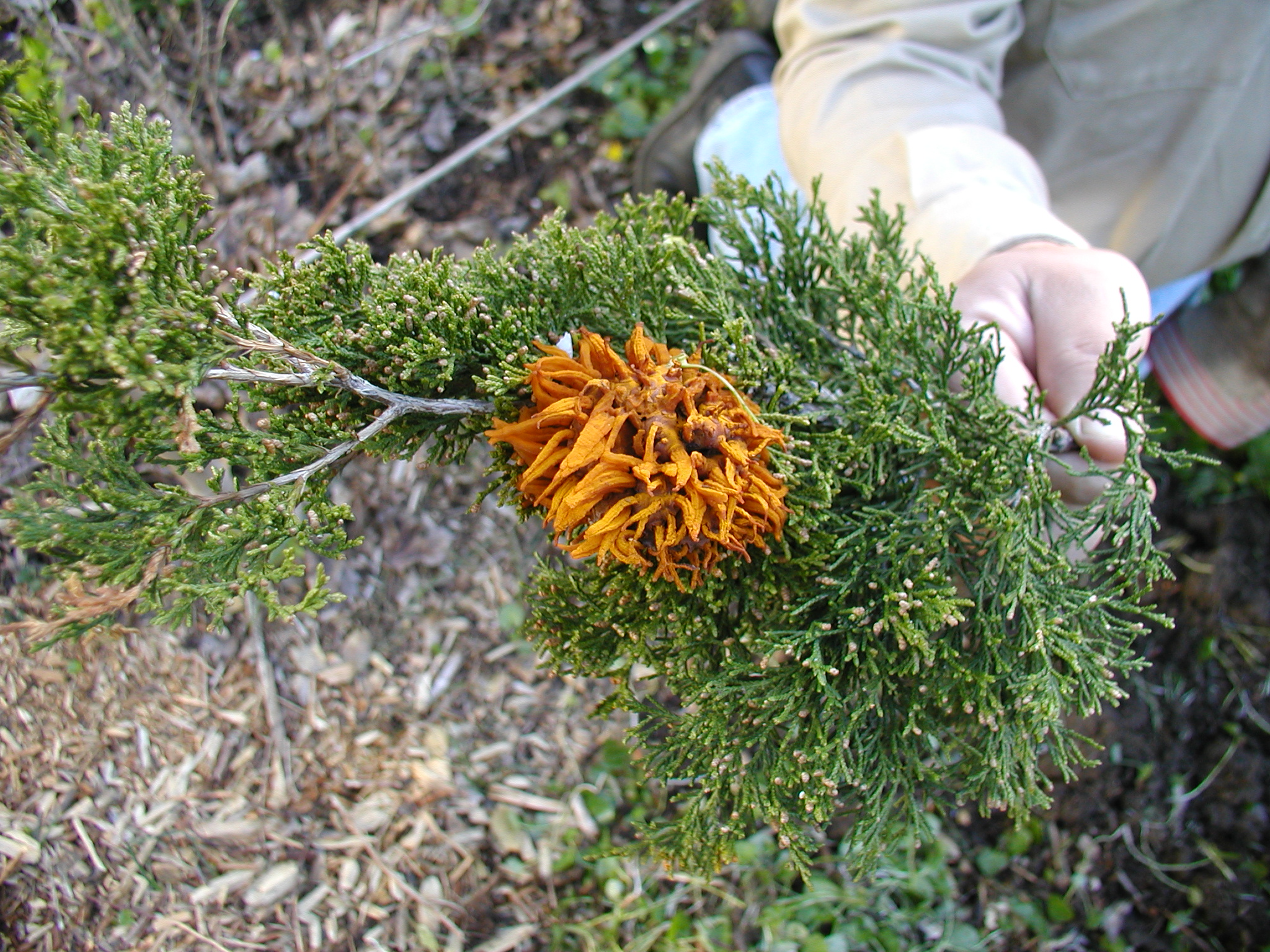
- Gymnosporangium juniperi

Scientific classification
- Kingdom: Fungi
- Division: Basidiomycota
- Class: Pucciniomycetes
- Order: Pucciniales
- Family: Gymnosporangiaceae
- Genus: Gymnosporangium; R.Hedw. ex DC. (1805)

Type species
- Gymnosporangium fuscum DC. (1805)

= Gymnosporangium =

Genus of fungi

Gymnosporangium is a genus of heteroecious plant-pathogenic fungi which alternately infect members of the family Cupressaceae, primarily species in the genus Juniperus (junipers), and members of the family Rosaceae in the subfamily Amygdaloideae (apples, pears, quinces, shadbush, hawthorns, rowans and their relatives). The common name cedar-apple rusts has been used for these fungi. According to the Dictionary of the Fungi (10th edition, 2008), there were 57 species in the genus. In 2023, Species Fungorum lists up to 74 species.

In junipers (the primary hosts, see photo), some species form a ball-like gall about 2–4 cm in diameter which produces a set of orange tentacle-like spore tubes called telial horns. These horns expand and have a jelly like consistency when wet. In other species, such as in G. clarvariforme, the telia are produced directly from the bark of the juniper with no obvious gall formation or swelling. The basidiospores are released and travel on the wind until they infect an apple, pear, hawthorn or suitable tree.

On the secondary hosts, the fungus produces yellowish depressions on the leaves. It also infects the fruit, which grows whitish tubes like a Medusa head. These are the spore tubes. These aeciospores must then infect a juniper to complete the life cycle. All the types of spores can spread over long distances.

The fungus does not cause serious damage to junipers, but apple and pear trees can suffer serious loss of fruit production due to the effects of the fungus. Although the genus has a worldwide distribution, its impact depends on availability of its two host plant species. Individual species are found in Northern and Central America, Asia, Europe and the Middle East.

Due to the economic impacts of the rusts in some areas where orchards are of commercial importance, some regions have attempted to ban the planting of and/or eradicate the coniferous hosts.

In 2020, the monotypic family Gymnosporangiaceae was proposed to accommodate Gymnosporangium. As accepted by Wijayawardene et al. 2020.

== Selected species and hosts ==
Species	Primary host	Secondary host	Common name
Gymnosporangium amelanchieris	Juniperus sect. Juniperus	Amelanchier	
Gymnosporangium clavariiforme	Juniperus sect. Juniperus	Amelanchier, Crataegus, Pyrus	Tongues of Fire
Gymnosporangium clavipes	Juniperus	Crataegus, Cydonia	Cedar-quince rust, quince rust
Gymnosporangium confusum	Juniperus	Crataegus, Cydonia, Mespilus, Pyrus	
Gymnosporangium cornutum	Juniperus sect. Juniperus	Sorbus subgen. Sorbus	Mountain ash juniper rust
Gymnosporangium cupressi	Cupressus	Amelanchier	
Gymnosporangium dobroznakovii	Juniperus sect. Juniperus	Pyrus	
Gymnosporangium fusisporum	Juniperus sect. Sabina	Cotoneaster	
Gymnosporangium gaeumannii	Juniperus communis	(not known)	
Gymnosporangium globosum	Juniperus	Crataegus	Cedar-hawthorn rust, American hawthorn rust
Gymnosporangium gracile	Juniperus	Amelanchier, Crataegus, Cydonia	
Gymnosporangium harknessianum	Juniperus	Amelanchier	
Gymnosporangium inconspicuum	Juniperus	Amelanchier	
Gymnosporangium juniperi-virginianae	Juniperus	Malus	Cedar-apple rust
Gymnosporangium kernianum	Juniperus	Amelanchier	Kern's pear rust
Gymnosporangium libocedri (Now Gymnotelium blasdaleanum, Pucciniaceae family)	Calocedrus	Amelanchier	Pacific Coast pear rust, Incense cedar broom rust
Gymnosporangium malyi	(not known)	Crataegus	
Gymnosporangium multiporum	Juniperus	(not known)	
Gymnosporangium nelsonii	Juniperus	Amelanchier	Witches broom rust, Rocky Mountain pear
Gymnosporangium nidus-avis	Juniperus sect. Sabina	Crataegus, Cydonia, Malus	Juniper witches' broom rust
Gymnosporangium sabinae	Juniperus	Pyrus, Malus, Crataegus	Pear rust, European pear rust, or pear trellis rust
Gymnosporangium torminalis-juniperinum	Juniperus sect. Juniperus	Sorbus torminalis	
Gymnosporangium tremelloides	Juniperus sect. Juniperus	Cydonia, Malus, Sorbus	
Gymnosporangium yamadae	Juniperus	Malus	Japanese apple rust

== Full list of species ==
As accepted by Species Fungorum;

- Gymnosporangium amelanchieris (DC.) E. Fisch. (1909)
- Gymnosporangium annulatum Y.M. Liang & B. Cao (2020)
- Gymnosporangium asiaticum Miyabe ex G. Yamada (1904)
- Gymnosporangium atlanticum Guyot & Malençon (1957)
- Gymnosporangium aurantiacum Syd. & P. Syd. (1904)
- Gymnosporangium bermudianum Earle (1893)
- Gymnosporangium bethelii F. Kern (1907)
- Gymnosporangium biseptatum Ellis (1874)
- Gymnosporangium clavariiforme (Wulfen) DC. (1805)
- Gymnosporangium clavipes Cooke & Peck (1873)
- Gymnosporangium confusum Plowr. (1889)
- Gymnosporangium connersii Parmelee (1965)
- Gymnosporangium corniculans F. Kern (1910)
- Gymnosporangium corniforme Sawada (1928)
- Gymnosporangium cornutum (Pers.) Arthur (1910)
- Gymnosporangium cunninghamianum Barclay (1890)
- Gymnosporangium cupressi Long & Goodd. (1921)
- Gymnosporangium davisii F. Kern (1908)
- Gymnosporangium dobrozrakovae Mitrof. (1969)
- Gymnosporangium echinulatum (Seung K. Lee & Kakish.) Y.M. Liang & B. Cao (2020)
- Gymnosporangium effusum F. Kern (1911)
- Gymnosporangium exiguum F. Kern (1908)
- Gymnosporangium exterum Arthur & F. Kern (1910)
- Gymnosporangium floriforme Thaxt. (1908)
- Gymnosporangium formosanum Hirats. f. & Hashioka (1935)
- Gymnosporangium fraternum F. Kern (1911)
- Gymnosporangium fusisporum E. Fisch. (1918)
- Gymnosporangium gaeumannii H. Zogg (1949)
- Gymnosporangium gjaerumii Korbonsk. & Azbukina (1997)
- Gymnosporangium globosum (Farl.) Farl. (1886)
- Gymnosporangium gracile Pat. (1902)
- Gymnosporangium gracilens (Peck) F. Kern & Bethel (1911)
- Gymnosporangium harknessianum (Ellis & Everh. ex F. Kern) F. Kern (1911)
- Gymnosporangium hemisphaericum Hara (1917)
- Gymnosporangium huanglongense Y.M. Liang & B. Cao (2016)
- Gymnosporangium hyalinum (Cooke) F. Kern (1911)
- Gymnosporangium inconspicuum F. Kern (1907)
- Gymnosporangium juniperi-virginianae Schwein. (1822)
- Gymnosporangium kanasense P. Zhao & L. Cai (2020)
- Gymnosporangium kernianum Bethel (1911)
- Gymnosporangium lachrymiforme P. Zhao & L. Cai (2020)
- Gymnosporangium lianhuaense Y.M. Liang, B. Cao & S.Q. Tao (2020)
- Gymnosporangium meridissimum Crowell (1940)
- Gymnosporangium mespili (DC.) F. Kern (1911)
- Gymnosporangium minus Crowell (1940)
- Gymnosporangium miyabei G. Yamada & I. Miyake (1908)
- Gymnosporangium monticola H.Y. Yun (2009)
- Gymnosporangium multiporum F. Kern (1909)
- Gymnosporangium nelsonii Arthur (1901)
- Gymnosporangium nidus-avis Thaxt. (1891)
- Gymnosporangium niitakayamense Y.M. Shen (2018)
- Gymnosporangium nipponicum G. Yamada (1935)
- Gymnosporangium orientale P. Syd. & Syd. (1912)
- Gymnosporangium padmarense Balf.-Browne (1955)
- Gymnosporangium paraphysatum Vienn.-Bourg. (1961)
- Gymnosporangium pleoporum Y.M. Liang & B. Cao (2020)
- Gymnosporangium przewalskii Y.M. Liang & B. Cao (2017)
- Gymnosporangium raphiolepidis (Syd.) T. Kasuya, K. Hosaka & Kakish. (2020)
- Gymnosporangium sabinae (Dicks.) G. Winter (1884)
- Gymnosporangium shennongjiaense P. Zhao & L. Cai (2020)
- Gymnosporangium shiraianum Hara (1919)
- Gymnosporangium sorbi (Arthur) F. Kern (1911)
- Gymnosporangium spinulosum P. Zhao & L. Cai (2020)
- Gymnosporangium taianum F. Kern (1964)
- Gymnosporangium tiankengense P. Zhao & L. Cai (2020)
- Gymnosporangium tianschanicum Z.Y. Zhao & J.Y. Zhuang (2007)
- Gymnosporangium torminali-juniperini E. Fisch. (1910)
- Gymnosporangium trachysorum F. Kern (1910)
- Gymnosporangium tremelloides R. Hartig (1882)
- Gymnosporangium tsingchenense C.T. Wei (1947)
- Gymnosporangium turkestanicum Tranzschel (1939)
- Gymnosporangium unicorne H.Y. Yun (2009)
- Gymnosporangium vauqueliniae Long & Goodd. (1939)
- Gymnosporangium yamadae Miyabe ex G. Yamada (1904)

== Other sources ==
- Phillips, D.H., & Burdekin, D.A. (1992). Diseases of Forest and Ornamental Trees. Macmillan.
- Scharpf, R.F., ed. (1993). Diseases of Pacific Coast Conifers. USDA Forest Service Agricultural Handbook 521.
