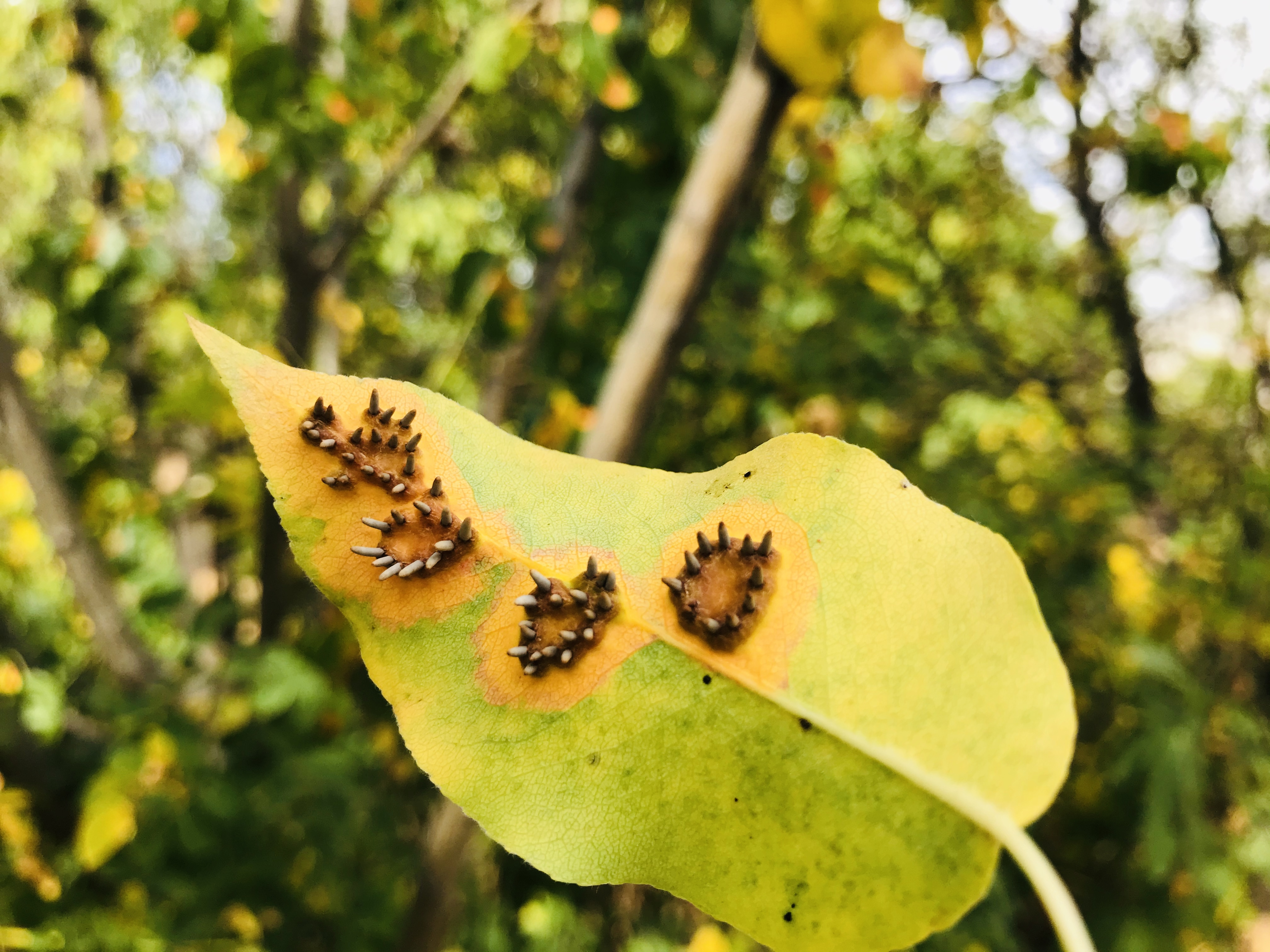
- Gymnosporangium sabinae on pear leaf, Sivas, Turkey

Scientific classification
- Domain: Eukaryota
- Kingdom: Fungi
- Division: Basidiomycota
- Class: Pucciniomycetes
- Order: Pucciniales
- Family: Gymnosporangiaceae
- Genus: Gymnosporangium
- Species: G. sabinae

Binomial name
- Gymnosporangium sabinae (Dicks.) Oerst. (1863)

Synonyms
- Tremella sabinae Dicks. (1785); Tremella digitata Hoffm. (1787); Aecidium cancellatum Pers. (1792); Puccinia juniperi Pers. (1794); Tremella clavariiformis ? digitata (Hoffm.) Pers. (1801); Roestelia cancellata Rebent. (1804); Gymnosporangium fuscum DC. (1805); Tremella fusca DC. (1806); Podisoma juniperi-sabinae Fr. (1832)

= Gymnosporangium sabinae =

Species of fungus

Gymnosporangium sabinae is a species of rust fungus in the subdivision Pucciniomycotina. Known as pear rust, European pear rust, or pear trellis rust, it is a heteroecious plant pathogen with Juniperus sabina (savin juniper) as the main primary (telial) host and Pyrus communis (common pear) as the main secondary (aecial) host.

== Life cycle ==
Like many rusts, G. sabinae requires two different hosts to complete its life cycle from year to year. Juniper is the winter host and pear is the summer host. Spores (called aeciospores) are produced from the fungal lantern-shaped growths which protrude from the blisters on the underside of the pear leaf which become airborne and infect junipers. This fungus overwinters in swellings or galls on infected twigs and branches of susceptible juniper plants. In the spring after a rain or heavy dew, the galls on the juniper produce tiny dark horn-like growths that become covered with an orange-brown gelatinous mass called telia. The corresponding stage on the pear trees is known as aecia. The telia and aecia release wind borne resting or hibernating spores (called teliospores and aeciospores) capable of infecting susceptible pear leaves and Juniper respectively. Spores produced from the fungus-induced swellings on juniper stems can be infectious up to 6 km. The disease causes a yellow-orange spot that turns bright red on leaves of pear trees. The disease can be particularly damaging on pear, resulting in complete defoliation and crop loss if not treated. The fungus feeds on the living cells of the host plant and is not capable of surviving on dead plant material, and so must either alternate with a different host or produce resting spores to pass the dormant season.

== Hosts and distribution ==
Juniperus sabina (savin juniper) is the main primary (telial) host, but G. sabinae also occurs on Juniperus chinensis and other species in Juniperus sect. Sabinae. The north European Juniperus communis (common juniper) is not a host. The main secondary (aecial) host is Pyrus communis (common pear), but other pear species, such as the ornamental Pyrus calleryana (Bradford pear), are also susceptible.

The native distribution of Gymnosporangium sabinae follows that of Juniperus sabina, a montane shrub with a range extending from southern Europe and the Alps into North Africa and Asia, and Pyrus communis (common pear) with a native range in continental Europe, the Middle East, and western Asia. The fungus has, however, extended its range in Europe as far north as Scandinavia and the British Isles through the frequent use of savin and other junipers as ornamental garden shrubs. Gymnosporangium sabinae has also been reported from North America. Pear rust is a regulated disease in some countries.

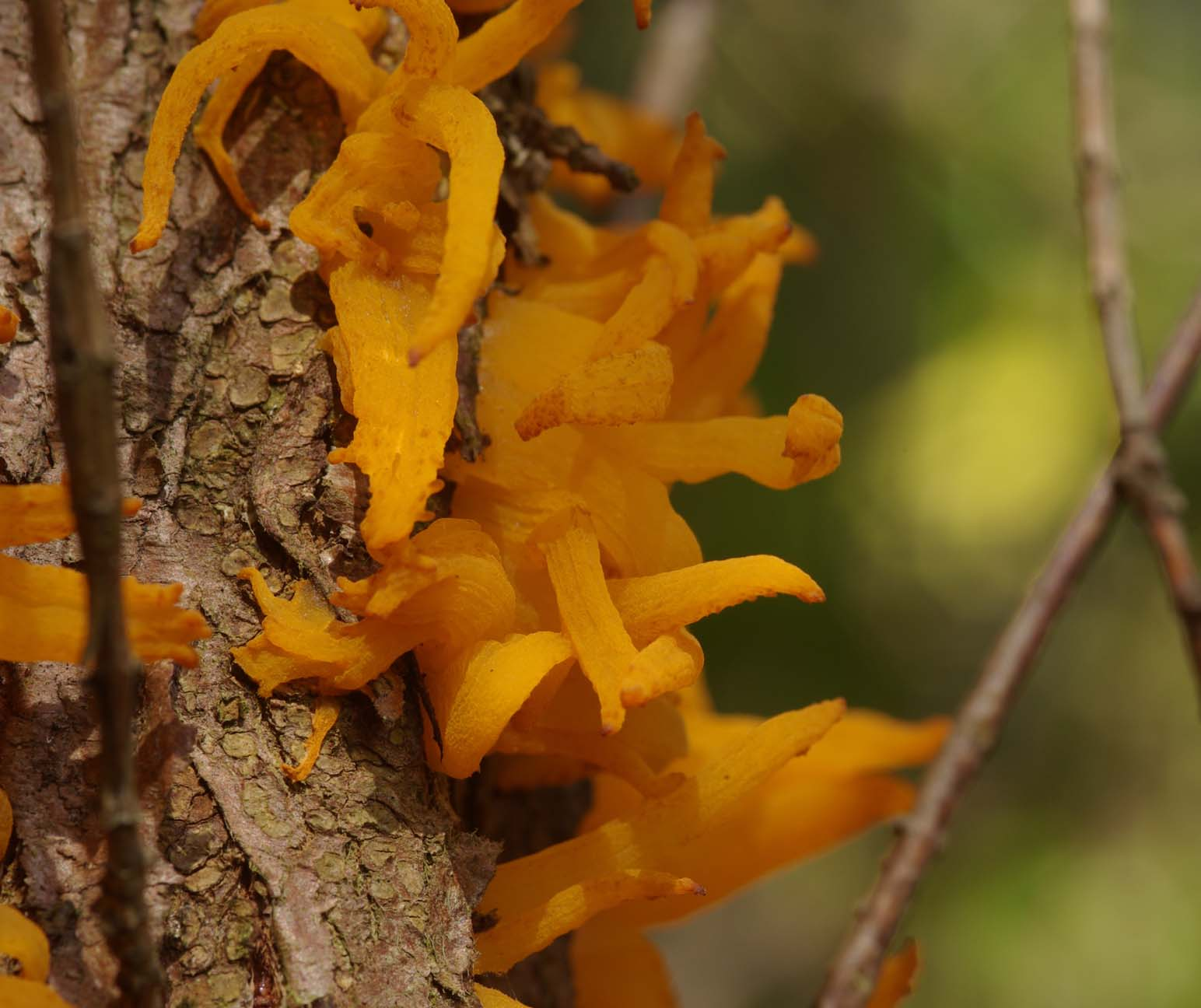
Telia emerging from juniper bark

== Control ==
Pruning out any infected juniper twigs and branches in winter and early spring can help reduce the spread of G. sabinae. The vulnerable point of the fungus lies in its usual inability once established on a tree to reinfect it. Generally, the fungus must cross over to the opposite tree host. The most direct method of control is to exterminate juniper hosts near pear trees, though spores can travel at least 6 km from one host to another. If there is a chance of infection, spraying pear trees with a fungicide in spring and summer (typically a systemic one that is certified as capable of dealing with rust) may help, although this is often not considered worthwhile.
