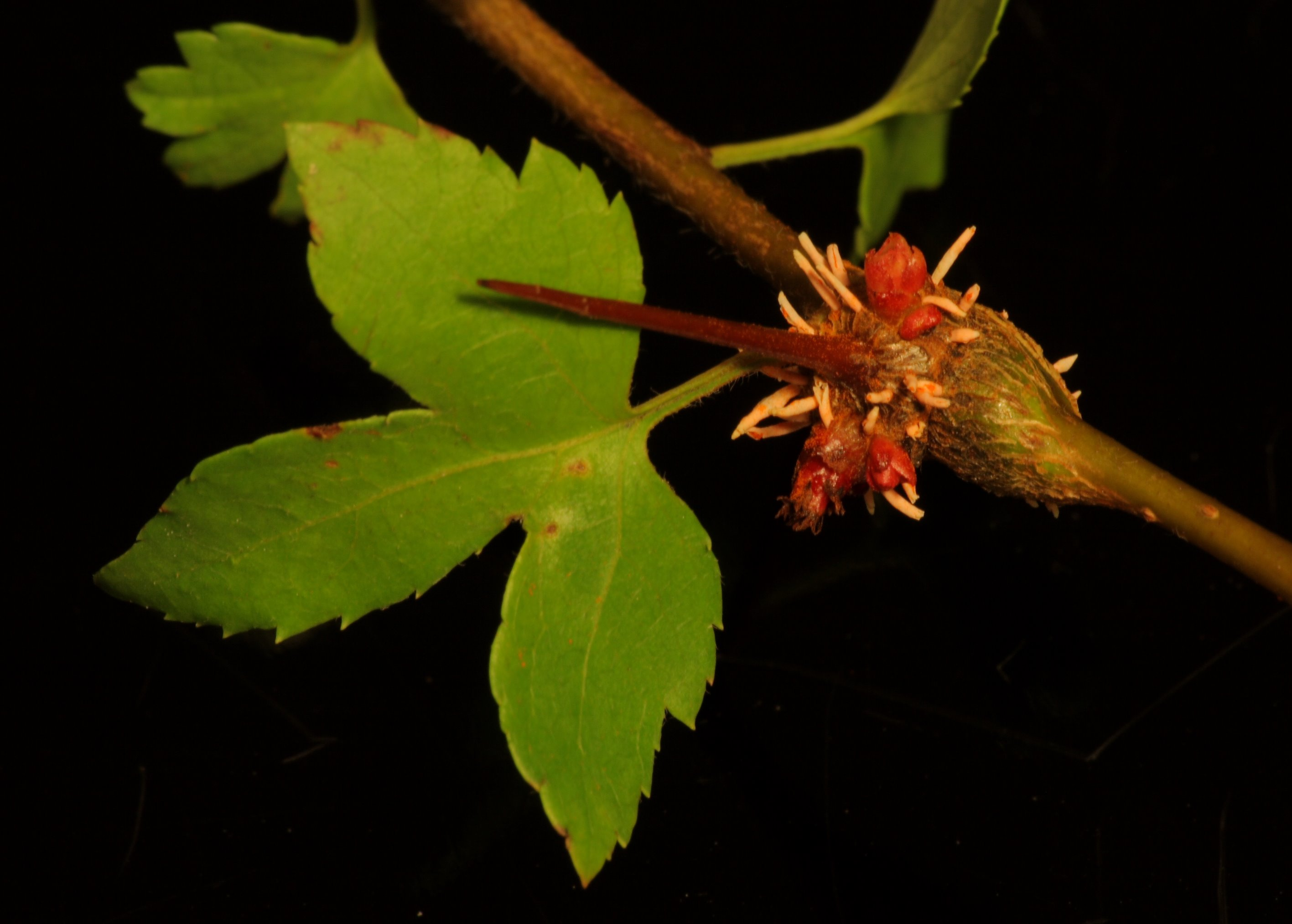
- A cedar-quince rust canker on a hawthorn branch

Scientific classification
- Domain: Eukaryota
- Kingdom: Fungi
- Division: Basidiomycota
- Class: Pucciniomycetes
- Order: Pucciniales
- Family: Gymnosporangiaceae
- Genus: Gymnosporangium
- Species: G. clavipes

Binomial name
- Gymnosporangium clavipes Cooke & Peck, (1873)

Synonyms
- Gymnosporangium germinale F. Kern, (1908)

= Gymnosporangium clavipes =

Species of fungus

Gymnosporangium clavipes is a plant pathogen, a fungus that causes cedar-quince rust. Similar to Gymnosporangium juniperi-virginianae and Gymnosporangium globosum, the fungus infects a wide range of Rosaceae, such as apple, hawthorn and quince trees, and also requires an evergreen host such as eastern red cedar or a number of other juniper species to complete its life cycle.
