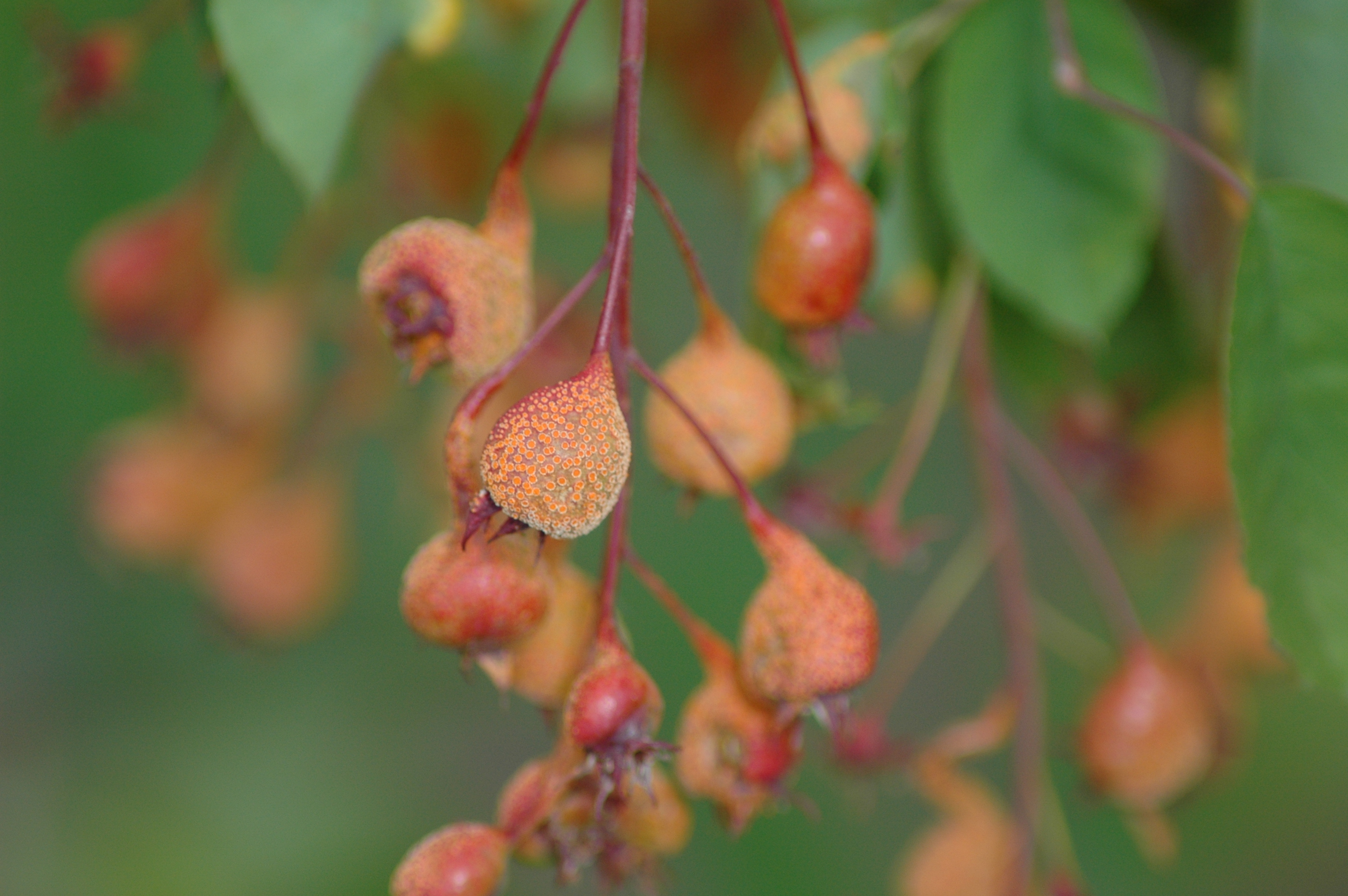
- Gymnosporangium libocedri on serviceberry fruits

Scientific classification
- Domain: Eukaryota
- Kingdom: Fungi
- Division: Basidiomycota
- Class: Pucciniomycetes
- Order: Pucciniales
- Family: Gymnosporangiaceae
- Genus: Gymnosporangium
- Species: G. libocedri

Binomial name
- Gymnosporangium libocedri (Henn.) F. Kern (1908)

= Gymnosporangium libocedri =

Species of fungus

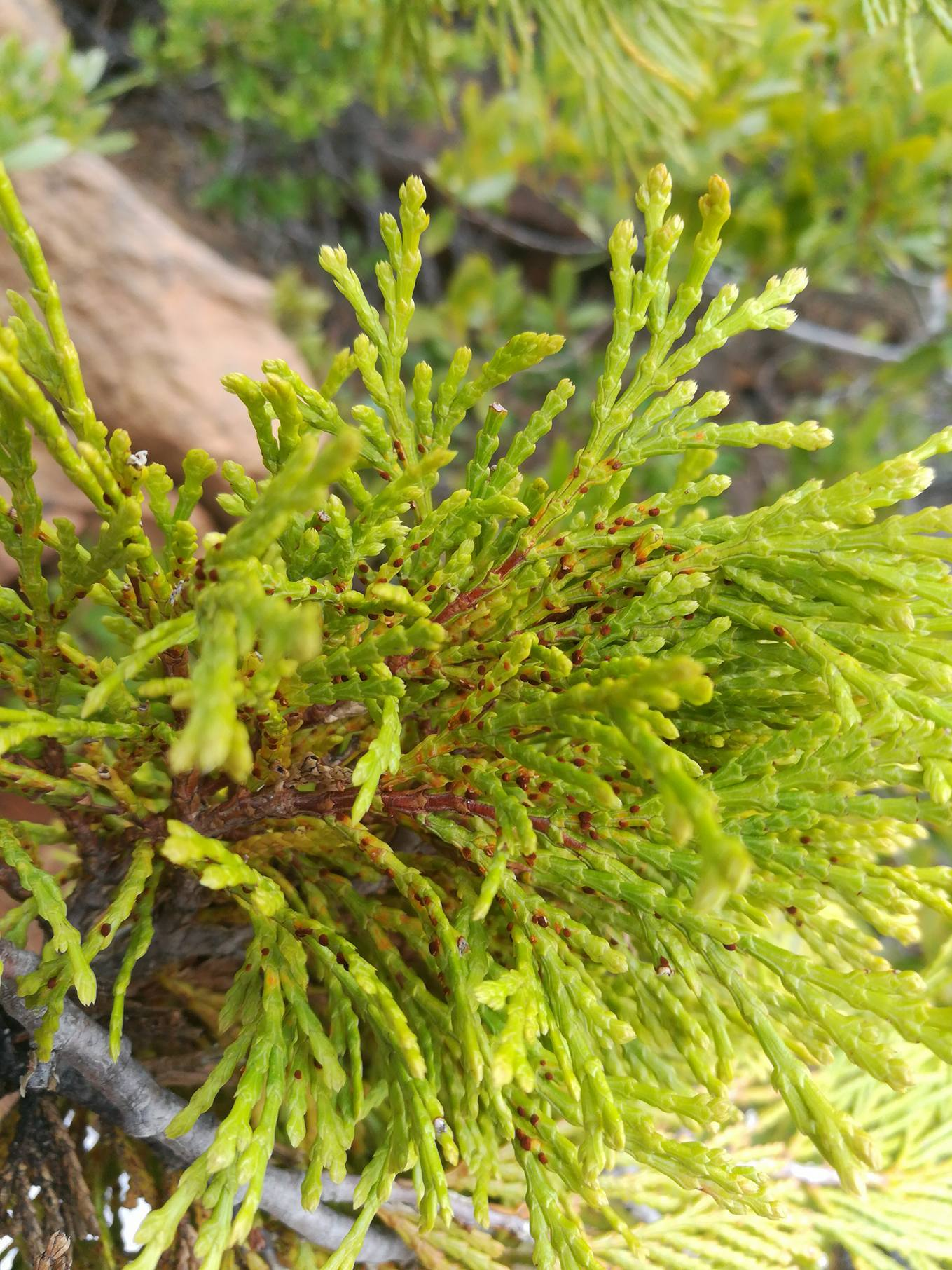
Gymnosporangium libocedri on incense cedar (Calocedrus decurrens)

Gymnosporangium libocedri, the Pacific Coast pear rust, is a plant pathogen and rust fungus. It produces orange gelatinous growths (telia) on incense cedar in the spring. Its secondary hosts include apple, crabapple, hawthorn, mountain ash, pear, quince, and serviceberry.

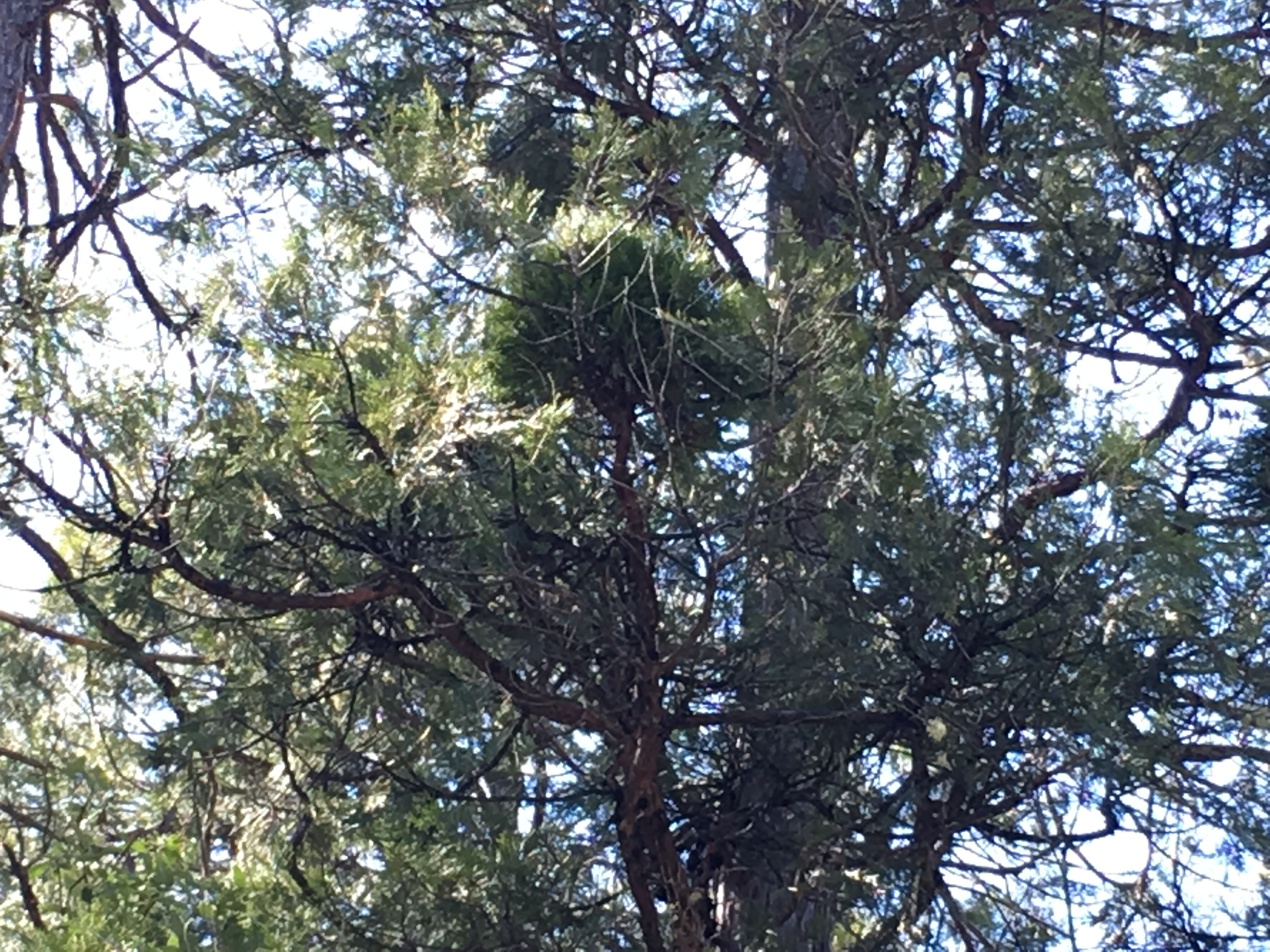
'brooming' on Calocedrus decurrens
