= Gymnosporangium kernianum =

Scientific classification
- Domain: Eukaryota
- Kingdom: Fungi
- Division: Basidiomycota
- Class: Pucciniomycetes
- Order: Pucciniales
- Family: Gymnosporangiaceae
- Genus: Gymnosporangium
- Species: G. kernianum

Binomial name
- Gymnosporangium kernianum Bethel, (1911)

Species of fungus

Gymnosporangium kernianum is a fungal plant pathogen.
