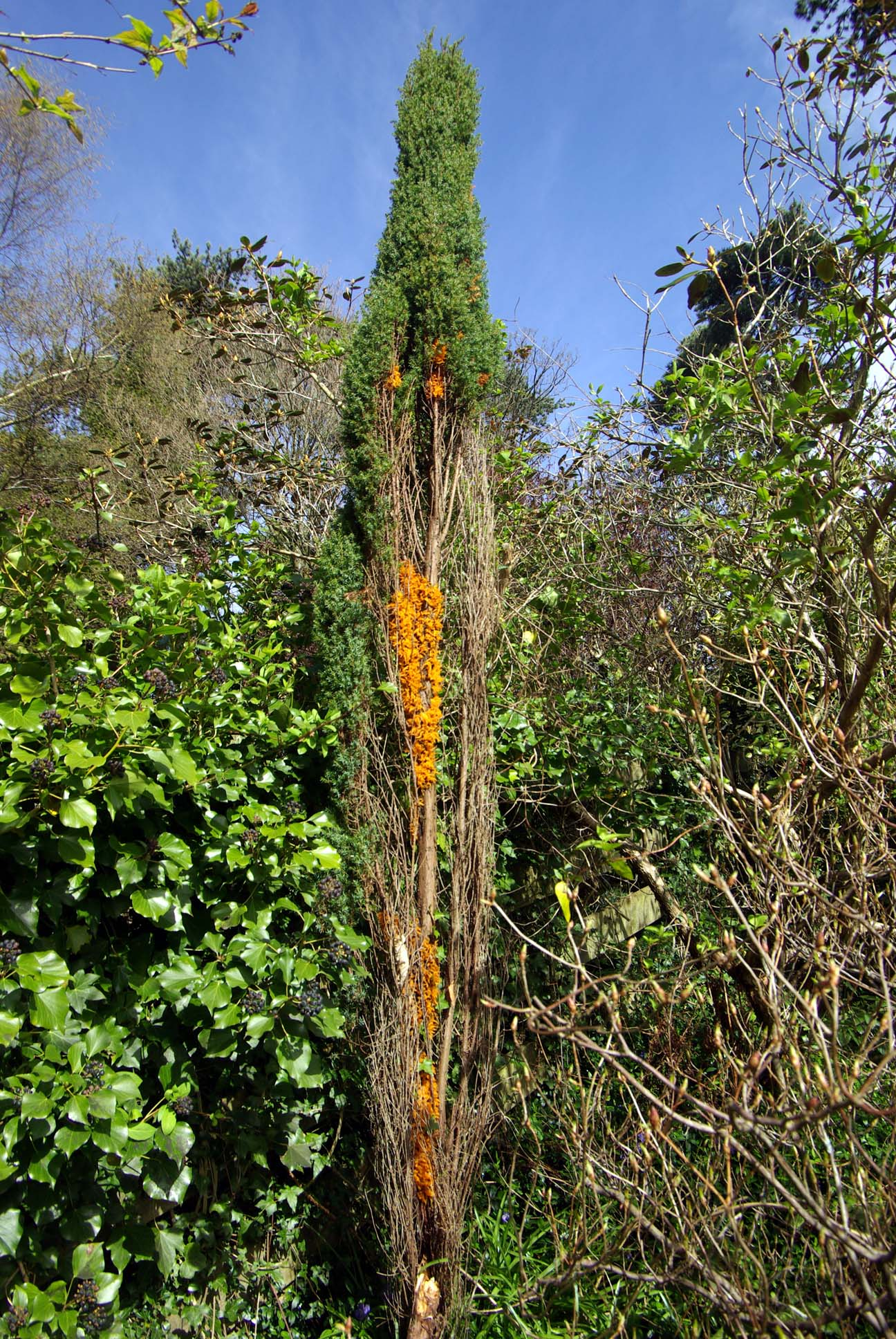
- G. clavariiforme telia on Juniper

Scientific classification
- Kingdom: Fungi
- Division: Basidiomycota
- Class: Pucciniomycetes
- Order: Pucciniales
- Family: Gymnosporangiaceae
- Genus: Gymnosporangium
- Species: G. clavariiforme

Binomial name
- Gymnosporangium clavariiforme (Wulfen) DC. (1805)

Synonyms
- Tremella clavariiformis Wulfen (1786); Podisoma clavariiforme (Wulfen) Duby (1830); Podisoma juniperi-communis Fr. (1832)

= Gymnosporangium clavariiforme =

Species of fungus

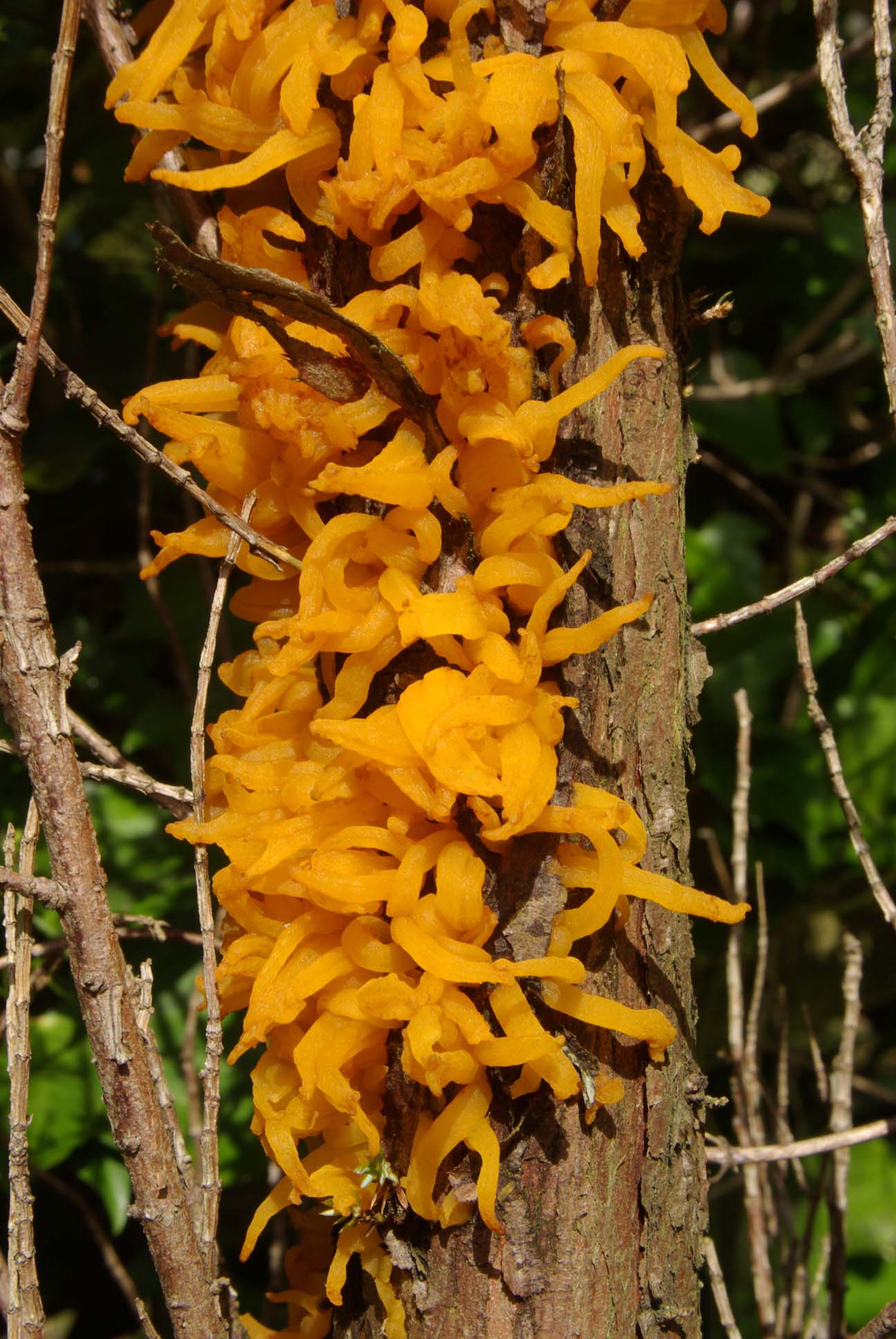
Close up of G. clavariiforme telia on Juniperus communis

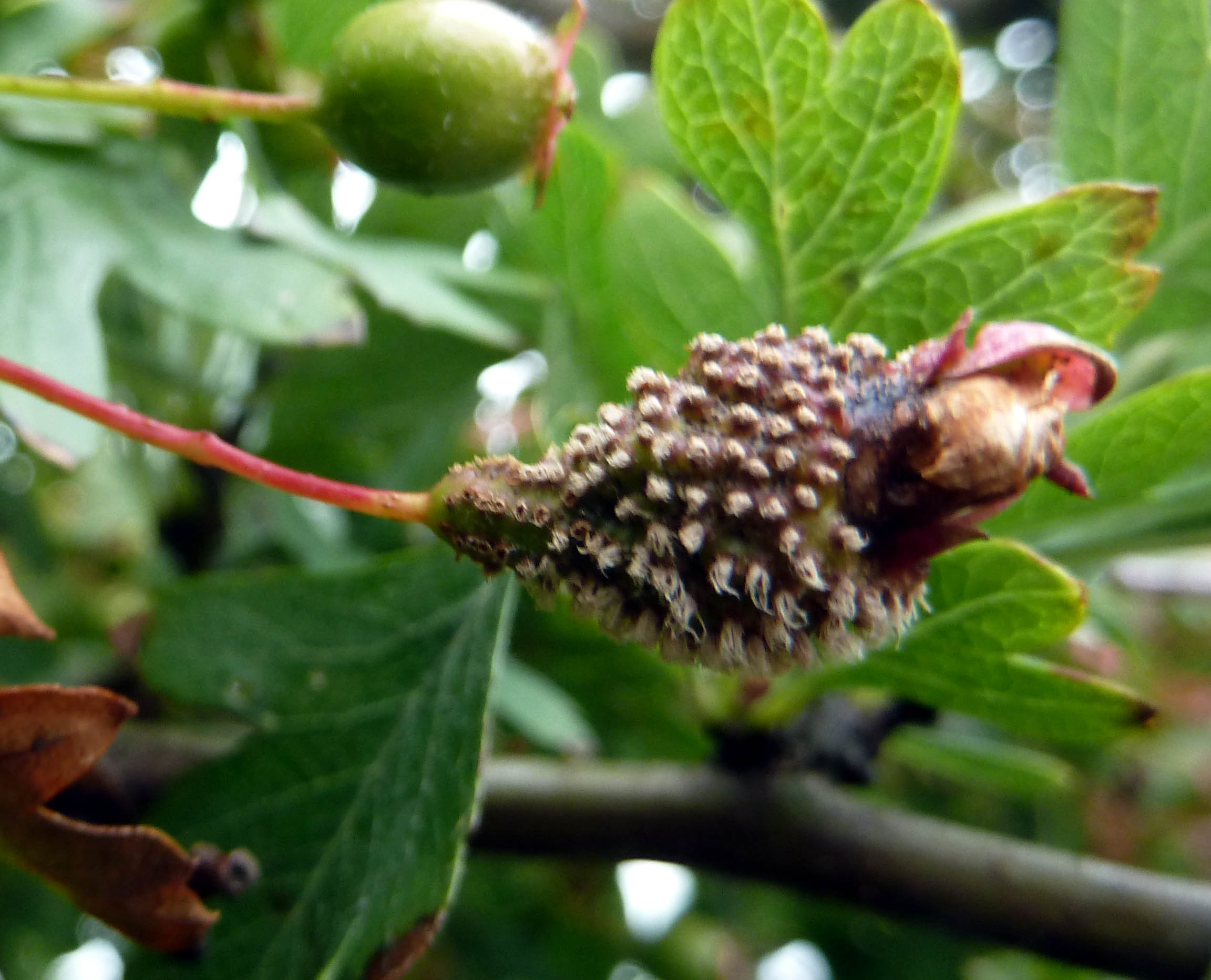
G. clavariforme aecial spore tubes on Hawthorn fruit

Gymnosporangium clavariiforme (tongues of fire) is a species of rust fungus which alternately infects Juniperus and hawthorns.

In junipers, the primary hosts, G. clavariiforme produces a set of orange tentacle-like spore tubes called telial horns. These horns expand and have a jelly like consistency when wet. The spores are released and travel on the wind until they infect a hawthorn tree.

On the secondary hosts, the fungus produces yellowish depressions on the leaves. It also infects the fruit, which grows whitish tubes like a Medusa head. These are the spore tubes. The spores must then infect a juniper to complete the life cycle.

The fungus does not cause serious damage to junipers, but hawthorns can suffer serious loss of haw production due to the effects of the fungus.
