= Gymnosporangium nelsonii =

Scientific classification
- Domain: Eukaryota
- Kingdom: Fungi
- Division: Basidiomycota
- Class: Pucciniomycetes
- Order: Pucciniales
- Family: Gymnosporangiaceae
- Genus: Gymnosporangium
- Species: G. nelsonii

Binomial name
- Gymnosporangium nelsonii Arthur, (1901)

Species of fungus

Gymnosporangium nelsonii is a fungal plant pathogen found in North America.
