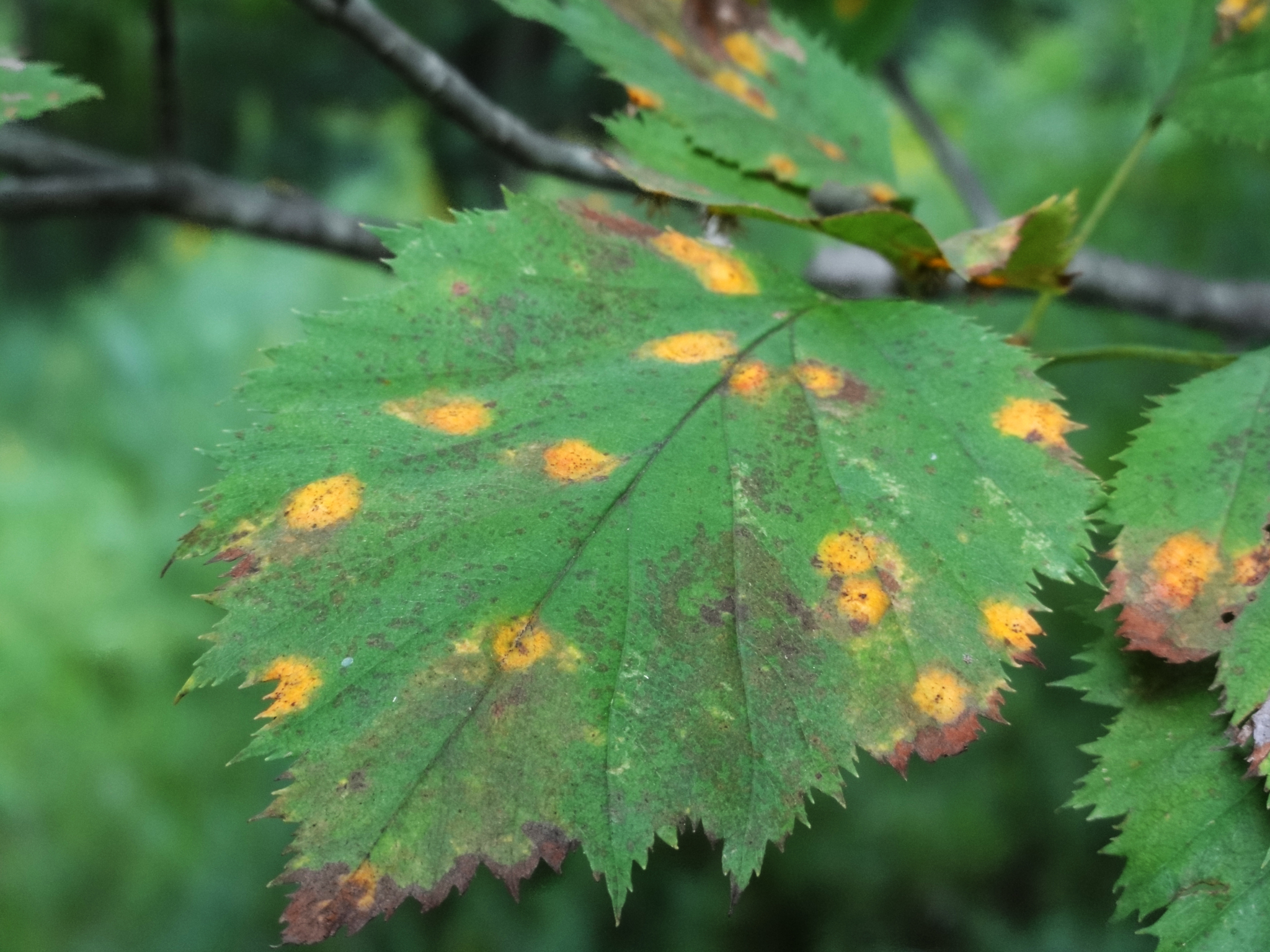

Scientific classification
- Kingdom: Fungi
- Division: Basidiomycota
- Class: Pucciniomycetes
- Order: Pucciniales
- Family: Gymnosporangiaceae
- Genus: Gymnosporangium
- Species: G. globosum

Binomial name
- Gymnosporangium globosum (Farl.) Farl.

= Gymnosporangium globosum =

Species of fungus

Gymnosporangium globosum is a fungal plant pathogen that causes cedar-hawthorn rust.

== Hosts and symptoms ==
Gymnosporangium globosum is a heteroecious rust fungus that requires two hosts to complete its life cycle. Its telial stage occurs on eastern red cedar, Rocky Mountain juniper, southern red cedar, and other common junipers while its aecial stage will be found on apple, crabapple, hawthorne, and occasionally on pear, quince, and serviceberry. The symptoms on the evergreens (telial stage) start with small galls that form on its twigs and small branches. After the galls grow to be 1/8 to 1/2 inch (3.2 to 12.7 mm) in diameter, circular indents (similar to those of a golf ball) will begin to appear on the twig side of the gall. Once spring arrives, a reddish-brown structure will begin to grow out of the indent eventually producing orange, jelly-like telial horns. These telial horns can reach up to 4 inches (100 mm) long and can be easily seen. The symptoms of the deciduous trees (aecial stage) begin with yellow spots that progress into orange-red as the season continues. Black dots (spermagonia) will then develop in the center of the lesion. Mature lesions will then produce small tubes (aecia). These lesions can be found on leaves, petioles, twigs, and fruit. The aecia are approximately 1/8 inch (3.2 mm) long.

== Disease cycle ==
The fungus begins its cycle overwintering in the galls of its telial host. During early spring, the telial horns form on the evergreen host, which produces teliospores that germinate creating a basidium. The basidium then produces basidiospores, which are released via wind and rain to infect its aecial, deciduous host's plant tissues (leaves, twigs, fruit, petioles). 80–90 days after the basidiospores germinate, aecia are produced that create aeciospores. The aeciospores are released into the air by the combination of wind and low humidity and infect susceptible evergreen hosts from midsummer into early fall beginning its telial stage. The fungus then survives as hyphae in the evergreen over that winter and begins to produce a gall the following spring. The gall increases in size throughout the summer and fall seasons so it can overwinter the spore bearing structures that will protrude out the following spring thus restarting the cycle. Thus, the entire life cycle of this rust takes 24 months to complete.

== Environment ==
The cedar-hawthorne rust is common all across the Midwest and Eastern United States. Its overwintering capability allows it to thrive in seasonal climates with harsh winters. The pathogen prefers humid and cloudy conditions for developing growth and the spores depend on rain and wind to be dispersed to its alternate host. Requiring two separate hosts to complete its life cycle is a limiting factor on where it can grow as both hosts must be present within a 1–2 mile radius.

== Management ==
There are a variety of ways to attempt to prevent this pathogen from spreading. The first being to prune out any infected branches of either host species. The second is to avoid planting two host plants within a two-mile radius of each other. This does not guarantee safety as there have been cases reported of cedar-hawthorne rust spores traveling 15 miles (24 km) to infect its complementary host. There are also a multitude of different hawthorne varieties that have been bred for resistance, so choosing one of those is wise if a known susceptible evergreen host is growing nearby. Resorting to fungicide application is also an option. It is found to be most effective when applied during the spore producing period of its life cycle. If all else fails, both hosts can live with G. globosum without dying for decades as the pathogen is rarely lethal.

== Importance ==
Many of the susceptible hosts are common ornamental landscaping shrubs and trees which add importance to this pathogen. Although cedar-hawthorne rust typically does not kill either of the host plants, it can cause atypical growth and present unattractive symptoms on the leaves, stems, and fruit of the plants. Apples are not the preferred deciduous host for Gymnosporangium globosum but it can decimate apple orchards. A closely related rust, Gymnosporangium juniperi-virginianae, causes cedar-apple rust and is the more common rust that affects apple yields and is a consistent difficulty for apple growers.

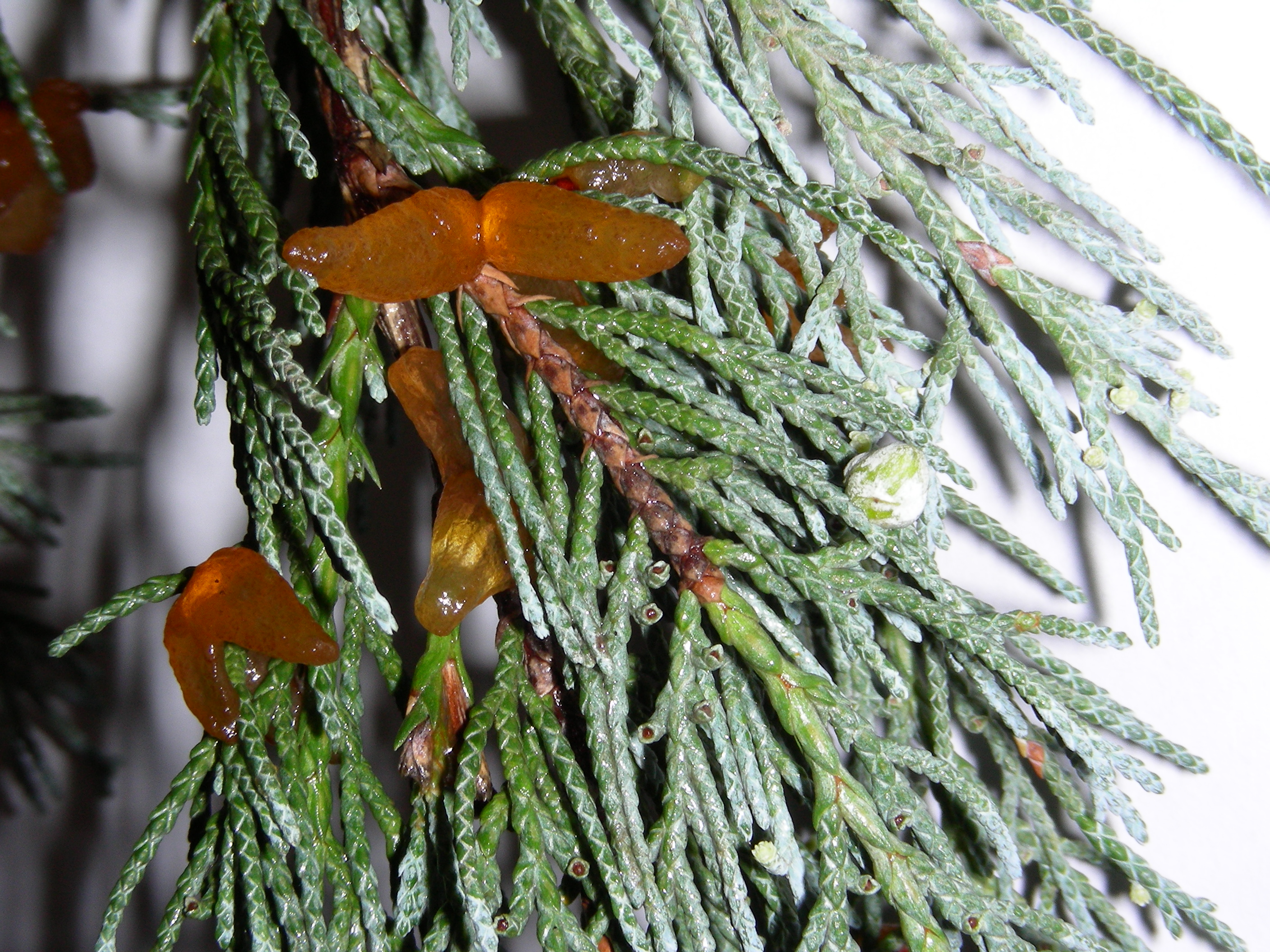
Telial horns on the juniper host

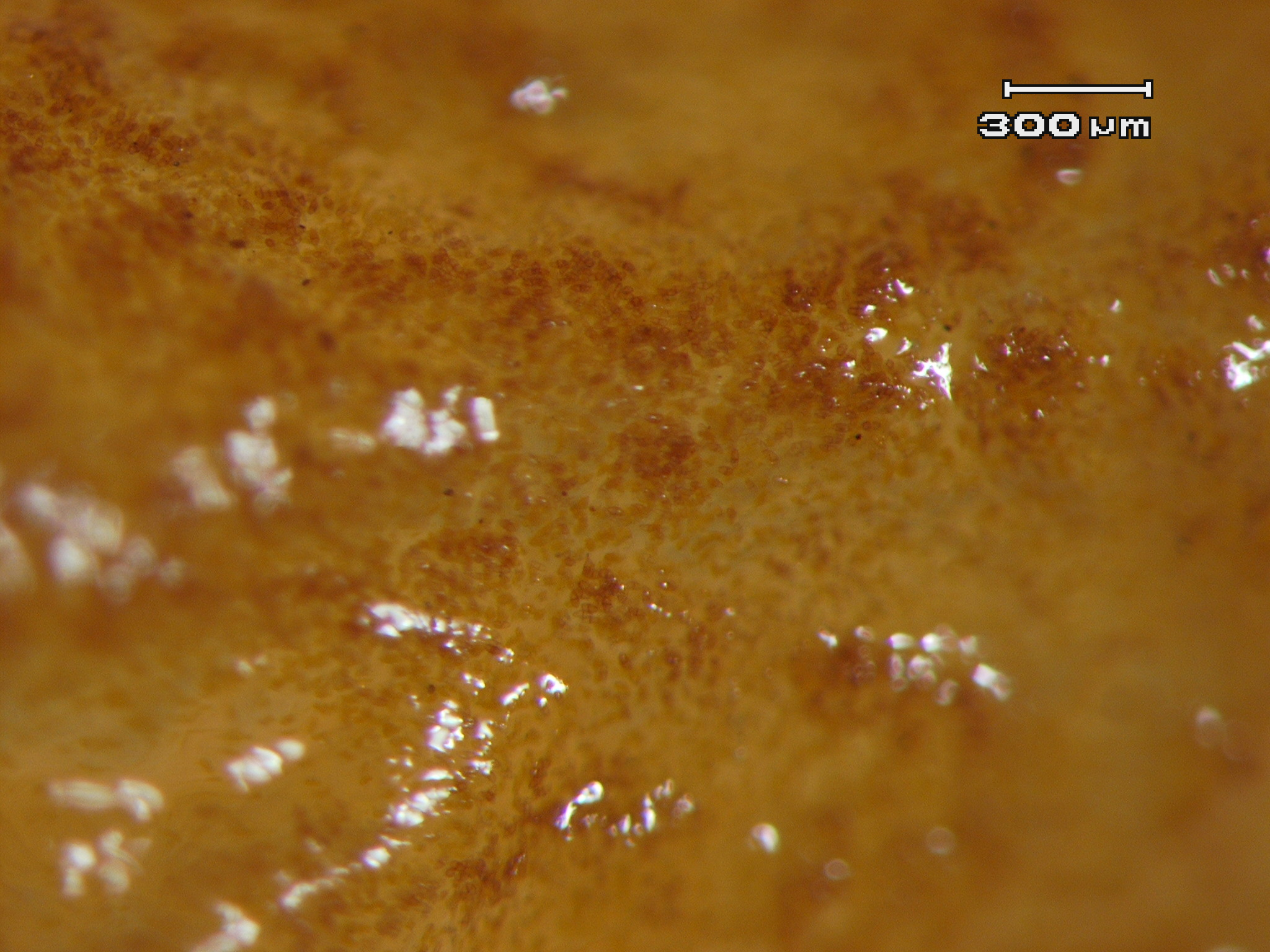
A close-up on a telial horn reveals masses of teliospores (tiny orange specks)

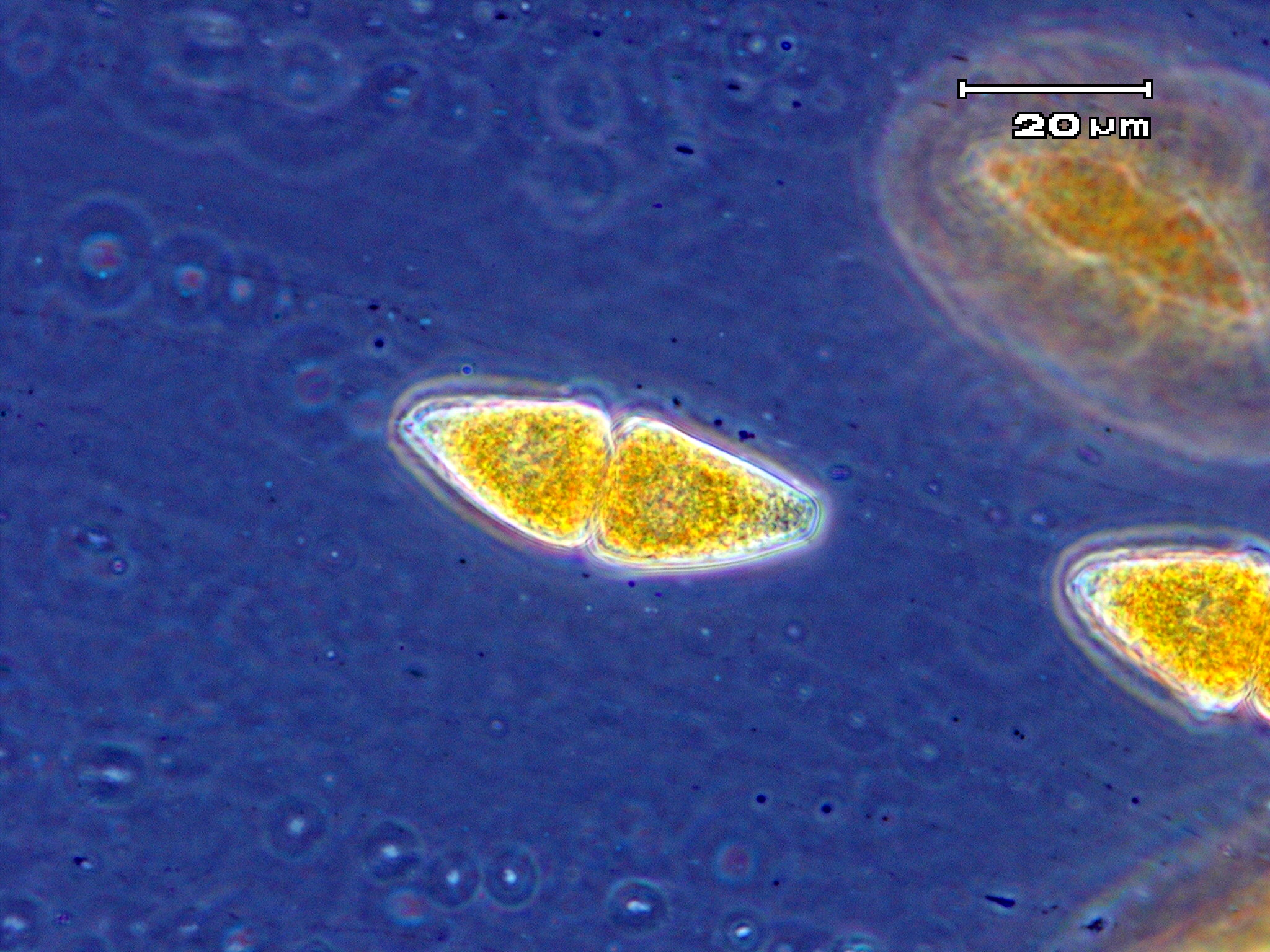
Two-celled teliospore of G. globosum
