= Gymnosporangium yamadae =

Scientific classification
- Domain: Eukaryota
- Kingdom: Fungi
- Division: Basidiomycota
- Class: Pucciniomycetes
- Order: Pucciniales
- Family: Gymnosporangiaceae
- Genus: Gymnosporangium
- Species: G. yamadae

Binomial name
- Gymnosporangium yamadae Miyabe ex G. Yamada, 1904

Species of fungus

Gymnosporangium yamadae is a plant pathogen that causes Japanese apple rust.
