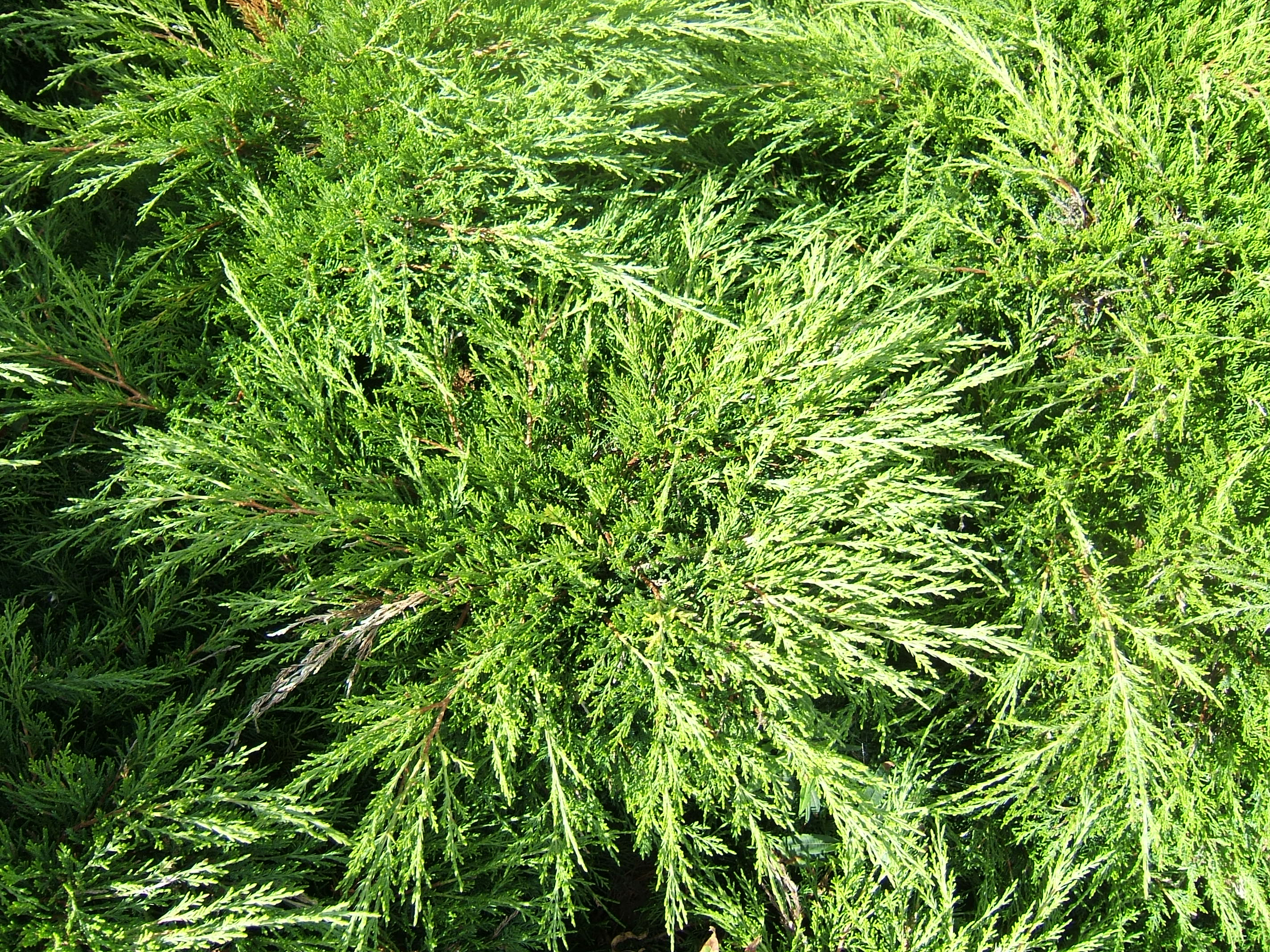
- Foliage on a cultivated specimen

Conservation status
- Least Concern (IUCN 3.1)

Scientific classification
- Kingdom: Plantae
- Clade: Embryophytes
- Clade: Tracheophytes
- Clade: Spermatophytes
- Clade: Gymnosperms
- Division: Pinophyta
- Class: Pinopsida
- Order: Cupressales
- Family: Cupressaceae
- Genus: Juniperus
- Section: Juniperus sect. Sabina
- Species: J. sabina

Binomial name
- Juniperus sabina L.

Synonyms
- Juniperus alpina Lodd. nom. illeg.; Juniperus arenaria (E.H.Wilson) Florin; Juniperus davurica Lindl. & Gordon; Juniperus davurica Pall.; Juniperus excelsa Willd. nom. illeg.; Juniperus humilis Salisb. nom. illeg.; Juniperus lusitanica Mill.; Juniperus officinalis Garcke; Juniperus tamariscifolia K.Koch; Sabina alpestris Jord.; Sabina cupressifolia Antoine ex K.Koch; Sabina davurica (Pall.) Antoine; Sabina officinalis Garcke nom. illeg.; Sabina tamariscifolia K.Koch; Sabina villarsii Jord.; Sabina vulgaris Antoine

= Juniperus sabina =

Species of conifer

Juniperus sabina, the savin juniper or savin, is a species of juniper native to the mountains of central and southern Europe and western and central Asia, from Spain to eastern Siberia, typically growing at elevations of 1,000–3,300 metres (3,300–10,800 feet).

== Description ==
The shrub is very variable in shape, up to 1–4 metres (3 1/2–13 feet) tall. The leaves are of two forms, juvenile needle-like leaves 5–10 millimetres (1/4–3/8 inch) long, and adult scale-leaves 1–2 mm long on slender shoots 0.8–1 mm thick. Juvenile leaves are found mainly on seedlings but mature shrubs sometimes continue to bear some juvenile leaves as well as adult, particularly on shaded shoots low in the crown. It is largely dioecious with separate male and female plants, but some individual plants produce both sexes. The cones are berry-like, 5–9 mm in diameter, blue-black with a whitish waxy bloom, and contain 1-3 (rarely 4 or 5) seeds; they are mature in about 18 months. The male cones are 2–4 mm long, and shed their pollen in early spring.

All parts of the plant are poisonous due to several toxic compounds including ethereal oils.

This plant is the alternate (telial) host of the Pear Rust fungus Gymnosporangium fuscum.

== Varieties ==
There are two varieties, treated by some botanists as distinct species:

- Juniperus sabina var. sabina. Juvenile foliage rare in adult plants.
- Juniperus sabina var. davurica (Pallas) Farjon (syn. J. davurica Pallas). Juvenile foliage frequent in adult plants.

The hybrid between Juniperus chinensis and Juniperus sabina, known as Juniperus × pfitzeriana (Pfitzer juniper, synonym J. × media), is found in the wild where the two species meet in northwestern China, and is also very common as a cultivated ornamental plant. It is a larger shrub, growing to 30–60 cm (12–24 in) tall.

== Uses ==
Juniperus sabina is a popular ornamental shrub in gardens and parks, with numerous named cultivars selected.

Savin was used in abortifacient drugs in 19th-century America. In Iran, savin fruit (known as ابهل abhal) are a traditional remedy to alleviate urinary and digestive problems.

== Gallery ==
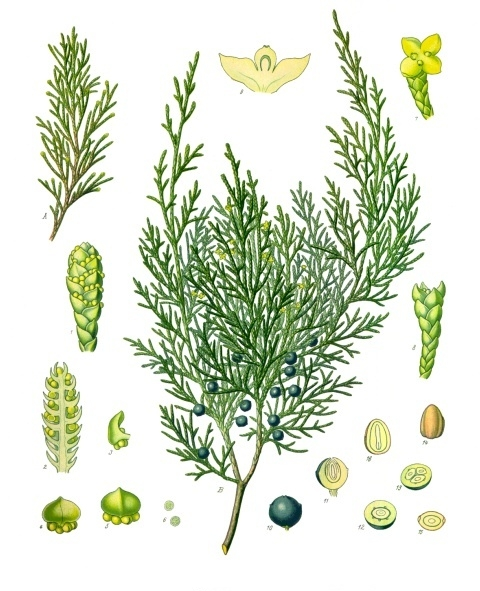
19th-century illustration

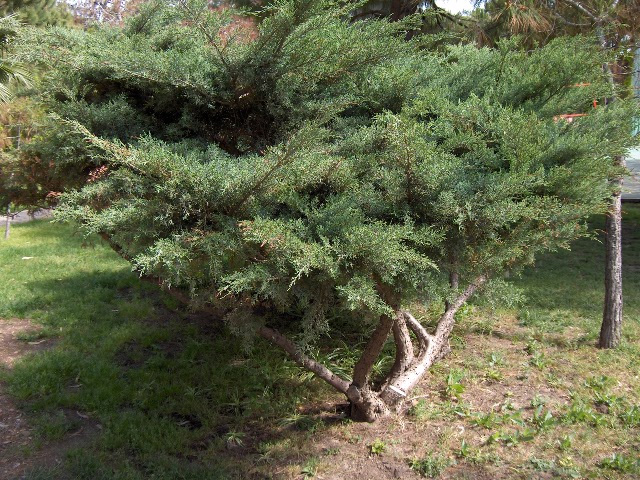
Juniperus × pfitzeriana

== See also ==
- List of Balkan endemic plants
