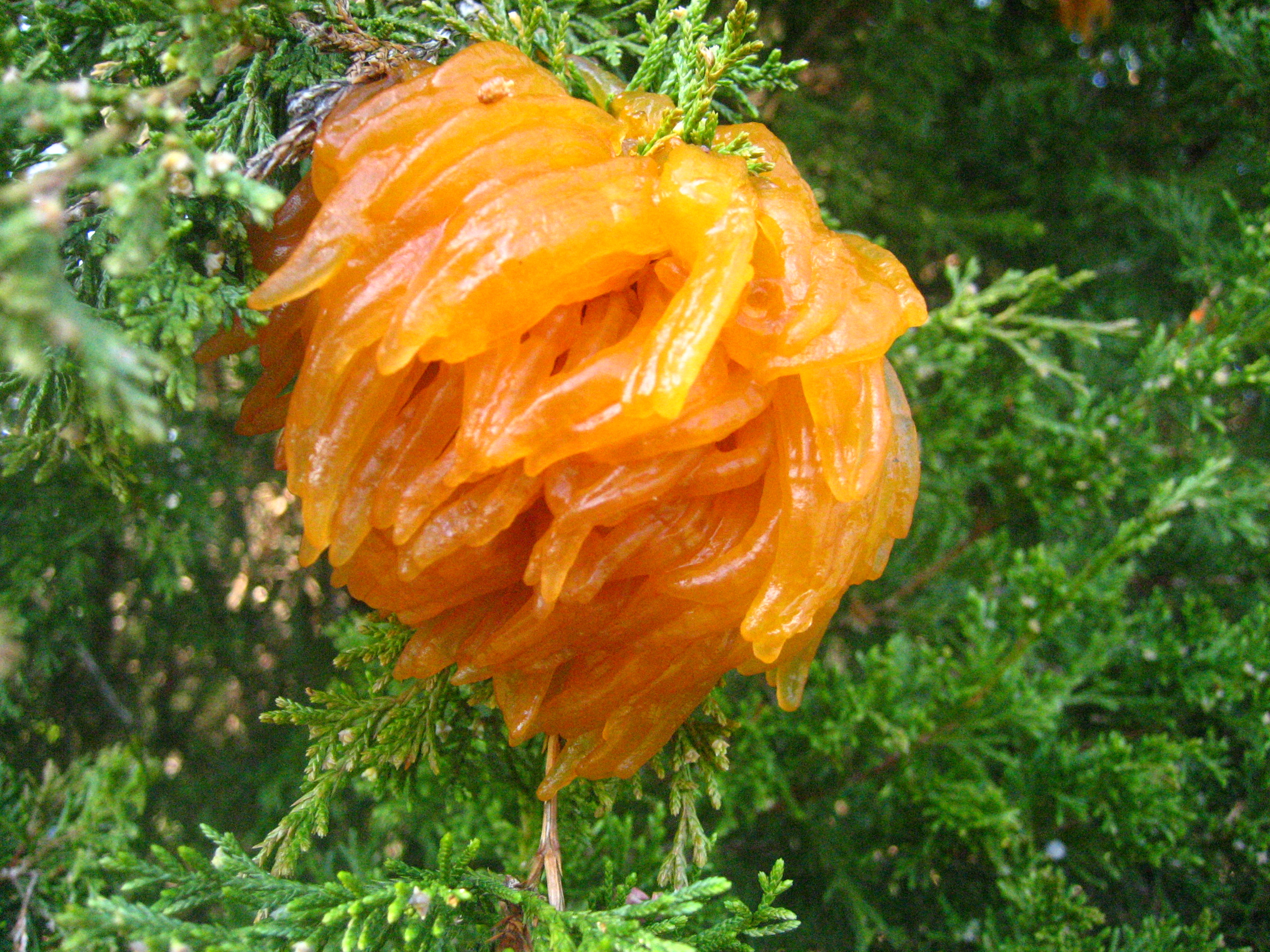
- Galls of cedar-apple rust on eastern red cedar

Scientific classification
- Kingdom: Fungi
- Division: Basidiomycota
- Class: Pucciniomycetes
- Order: Pucciniales
- Family: Gymnosporangiaceae
- Genus: Gymnosporangium
- Species: G. juniperi-virginianae

Binomial name
- Gymnosporangium juniperi-virginianae Schwein. (1822)

= Gymnosporangium juniperi-virginianae =

Species of fungus

Gymnosporangium juniperi-virginianae is a plant pathogen that causes cedar-apple rust. In virtually any location where apples or crabapples (Malus) and eastern red cedar (Juniperus virginiana) coexist, cedar apple rust can be a destructive or disfiguring disease on both the apples and cedars. Apples, crabapples, and eastern red cedar are the most common hosts for this disease. Similar diseases can be found on quince and hawthorn and many species of juniper can substitute for the eastern red cedars.

== Symptoms ==
On the apple tree, the infections occur on leaves, fruit and young twigs. The brightly colored spots produced on the leaves make it easy to identify. Small, yellow-orange spots appear on the upper surfaces of the leaves, anytime from April to June. These spots gradually enlarge and turn orange or red and may show concentric rings of color. Drops of orange liquid may be visible on the spots. Later in the season, black dots appear on the orange spots on the upper leaf surface. In late summer, tube-like structures develop on the undersurface of the apple leaf. Infected leaves sometimes drop prematurely, particularly during drought conditions or when the tree is under additional stress. Infections on fruit are usually near the blossom end and are somewhat similar to the leaf lesions.

On the eastern red cedar host, the fungus produces reddish-brown galls from 1/4 to 2 inches (6 to 50 mm). After reaching a diameter of about 1/2 inch (13 mm), the galls show many small circular depressions. In the center of each depression is a small, pimple-like structure. In the spring these structures absorb water during rainy periods and elongate into orange gelatinous telial horns that are 10–20 mm long. The wind carries the microscopic spores to infect apple leaves, blossoms, fruit and young twigs on trees within a radius of several miles of the infected tree.

On other species of juniper more common in landscaping and bonsai, the sizes of the infections are reduced. Early in the infection, the galls are small bumps on the woody portions of the plant. They maintain the orange gelatinous form after the first warm rains of spring but generally on a greatly reduced scale.

== Disease cycle ==
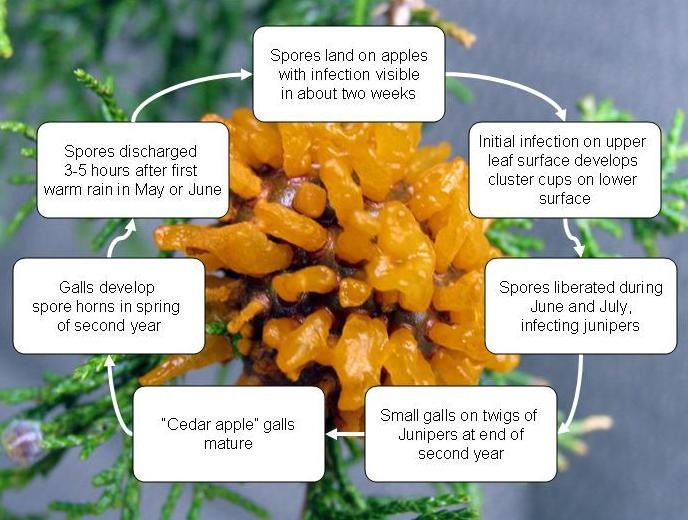
Depiction of the life cycle of cedar apple rust

Cedar apple rust is caused by the fungi Gymnosporangium or more specifically Gymnosporangium juniperi-virginianae that spend part of their life cycles on Eastern Red Cedars growing near orchards. The complex disease cycle of cedar apple rust, alternating between two host plants, was first delineated by Anders Sandøe Ørsted.

When exposed to the first warm rain of spring, the small bumps on the galls absorb water, swell, and produce telial horns –gelatinous masses that produce teliospores. When swollen, teliospores will germinate and produce basidiospores which are forcibly discharged and travel along air currents to infect apple trees and other alternate hosts. The telial horns will dry out once the rain passes and will lose their gelatinous appearance, instead resembling dark brown threads. When the rain returns, the horns will swell again. This process can repeat eight to ten times during the spring. It can take as little as four hours for basidiospores to form inside the telial horns under optimal conditions.

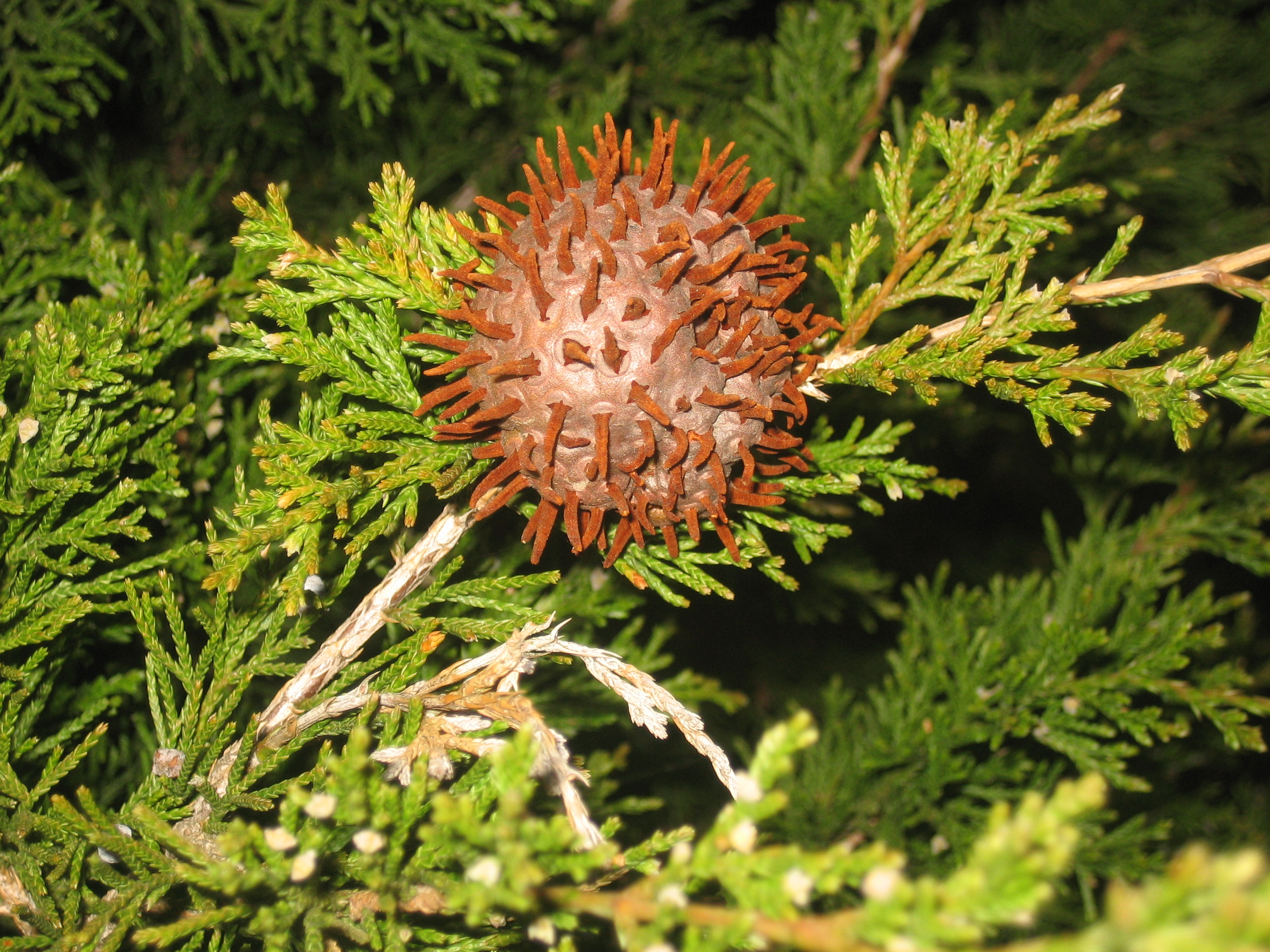
Gall on eastern red cedar (Juniperus virginiana) before rain.

Wind carries the spores to apple leaves at about the time that apple buds are in the pink or early blossom stage. Upon reaching apple buds or leaves covered by films of water, the spores attach themselves to the young leaves, germinate, and enter the leaf or fruit tissues. Light infection can take place in as little as two hours under favorable conditions. Heavy infections take at least four hours to develop. Lower temperatures delay infection. Yellow-orange lesions develop on the upper sides of leaves or on fruit one to two weeks following infection. These lesions contain pycnia and pycniospores. These lesions will produce a sticky honeydew like substance to attract insects that assist in the transport of the pycniospores to different lesions, allowing for sexual recombination.

One to two months later, in July and August, orange-yellow aecia are produced in concentric rings on the bottom of the apple leaves or surrounding the pycnia on the fruit. The aecia produce aeciospores. The wind carries the spores back to eastern red cedars, completing the infectious cycle. The spores land on cedar needle bases or in cracks or crevices of twigs. There, they germinate and produce small, green-brown swellings about the size of a pea. Galls do not produce spores until the second spring. However, mature galls usually are present every year. This fungus produces four out of five of the spores known to be produced by the class Urediniomycetes during its life cycle. (These include teliospores, basidiospores, spermatia (also called pycniospores), and aeciospores. The type of spore it does not produce is urediniospores.) Rust fungi have a complicated life-cycle with up to five types of spores (each borne on a different type of structure) in its life cycle and often an alternate host, and an "alternate alternate host" as well. Basidiomycetes that have all 5 spore stages and those with less are said to be "macrocyclic" or "microcyclic" respectively.

== Control ==
Because apples are an economically important crop, control is usually focused there. Interruption of the disease cycle is the only effective method for control of the cedar apple rust. Removing as many cedar trees within close proximity of an apple orchard will reduce potential sources of inoculum. The closer the tree to the orchard the greater impact removal will have. Removing all junipers within the 4–5 miles (6.5–8 km) would provide complete control of the disease. Additionally, pruning and disposing of galls from infected cedar trees would reduce sources of inoculum for infection of apple trees, however this would likely be time consuming and uneconomical. For those doing bonsai, it is common to have the trees within feet of each other and on the central eastern seaboard of the United States, eastern red cedar is a common first-growth conifer along roadsides.

There are differences in the susceptibility of various apple varieties. 'Jonathan', 'Rome Beauty', 'Wealthy', 'Stayman', 'Jonafree' and 'York Imperial' are susceptible. 'Grimes Golden', 'Red Delicious', 'Winesap', 'Redfree', 'McIntosh', 'Liberty', and 'Priscilla' are resistant. Crabapples are generally more susceptible than apples. Resistant crabapples include 'Adams', 'Beverly', 'Candied Apple', 'Dolgo', 'Donald Wyman', 'Eleyi', 'Inglis', 'Indian Summer', 'Liset', 'Mt. Arbor', M. persicifolia, 'Red Jewel', 'Robinson', 'Robusta', 'Royalty', M. sargentii, 'Tina', 'Snowdrift', and 'Special Radiant'. Resistant Crataegus (Hawthorn) include C. crus-galli, series Intricatae, C. laevigata, 'Autumn Glory', C. phaenopyrum, C. pruinosa, C. viridis, and 'Winter King'. The resistant varieties are less susceptible to attack, but that does not mean that they are free from an aggressive attack.

Fungicide sprays applied in a timely manner are highly effective against the rust diseases during the apple cycle. Most protective fungicide sprays are applied four times at 7- to 10-day intervals, starting with pink bud on crabapples. These applications are to protect the apples from spores being released from the cedar host in mid-spring. If cedar apple rust disease is diagnosed on apple fruits and leaves it is far too late to spray. Although curative fungicides also exist for cedar apple rust, they must still be applied before trees begin to develop symptoms. Systemic fungicides are available as well, which require fewer sprays during the season. However, there are no fungicides available to home gardeners that can be used on trees that produce fruit which will be eaten by people.

== Gallery ==
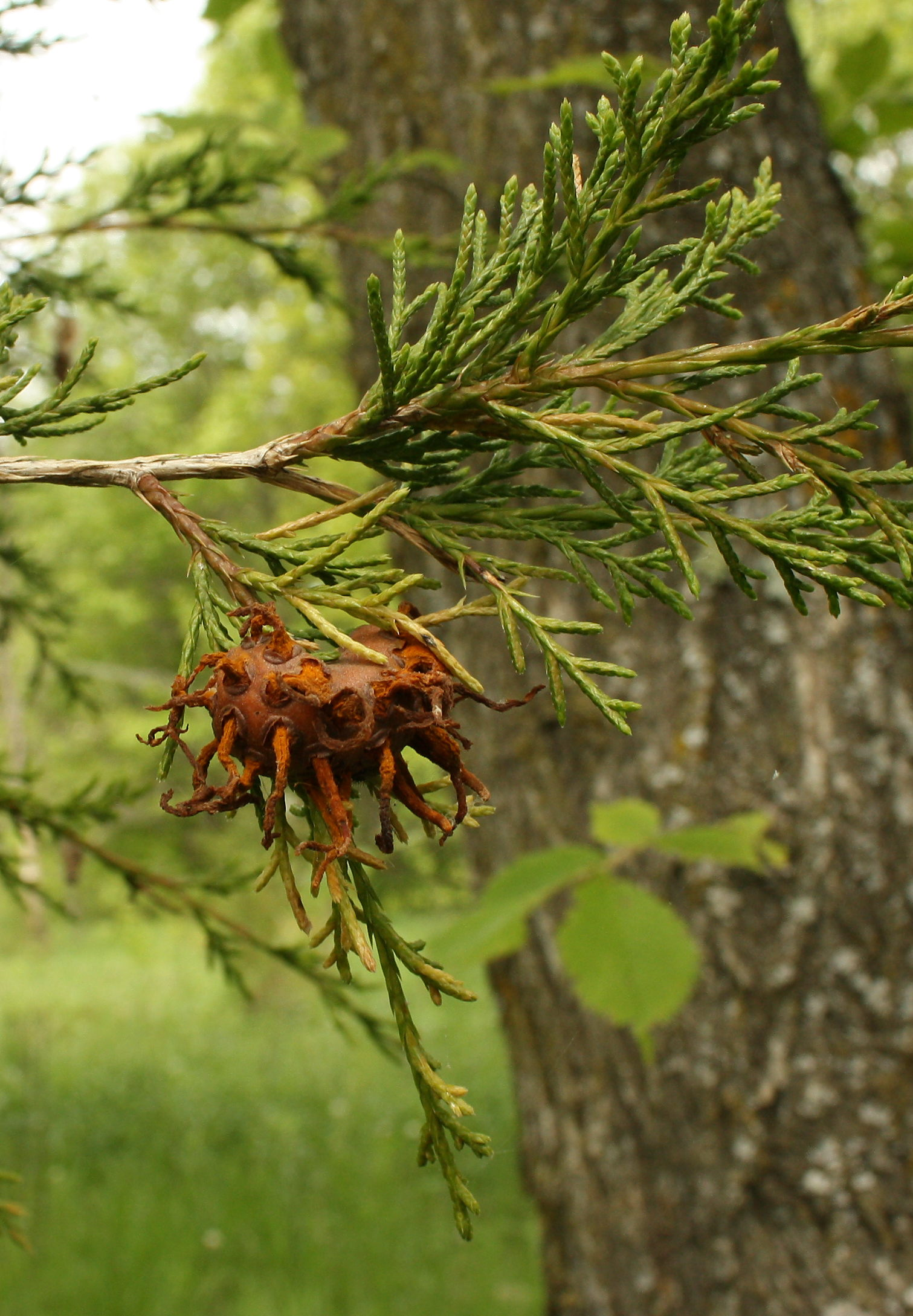
Another gall on eastern redcedar (Juniperus virginiana)

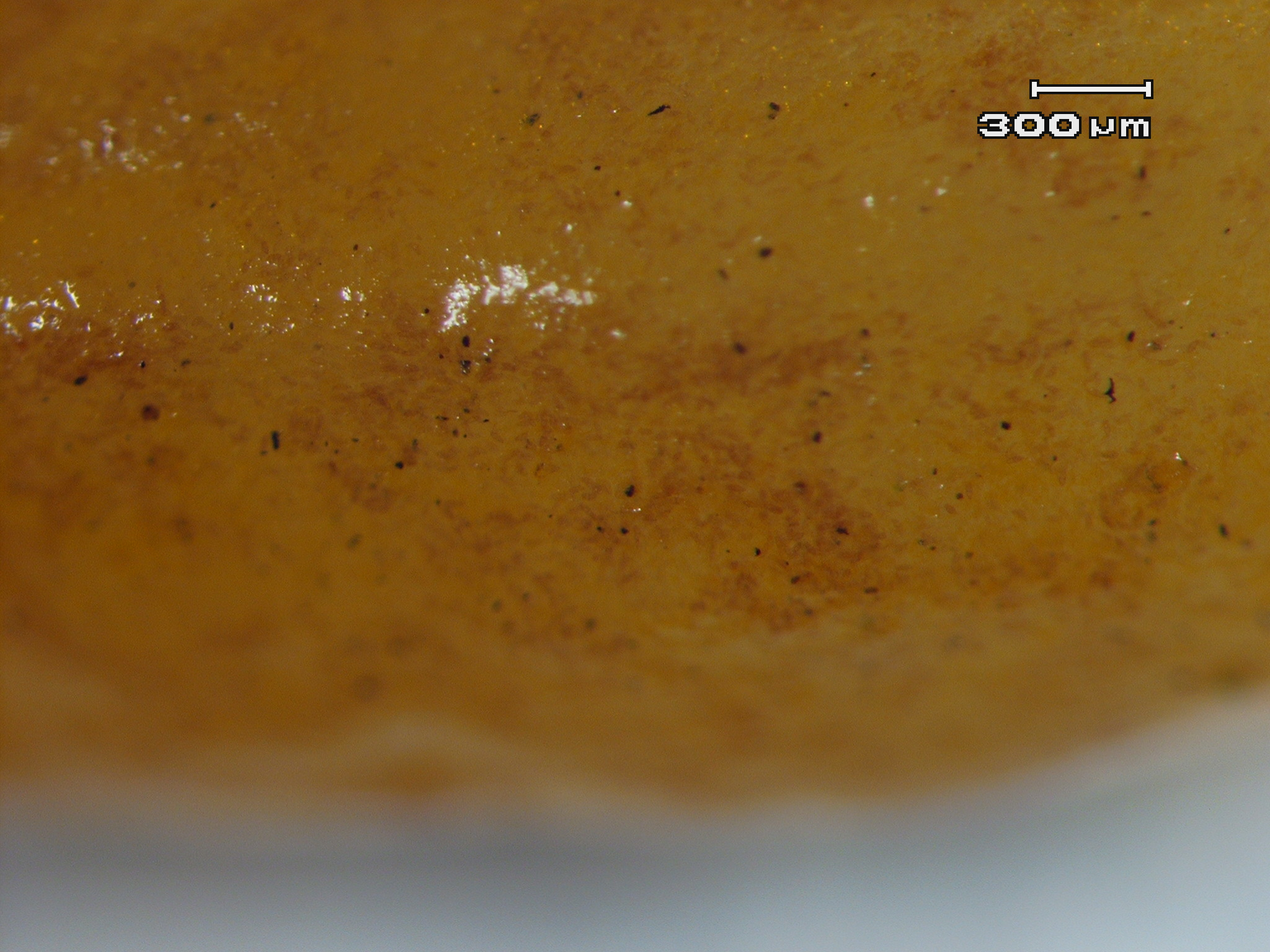
Close-up on a telial horn: It is full of teliospores (visible as tiny orange spots)

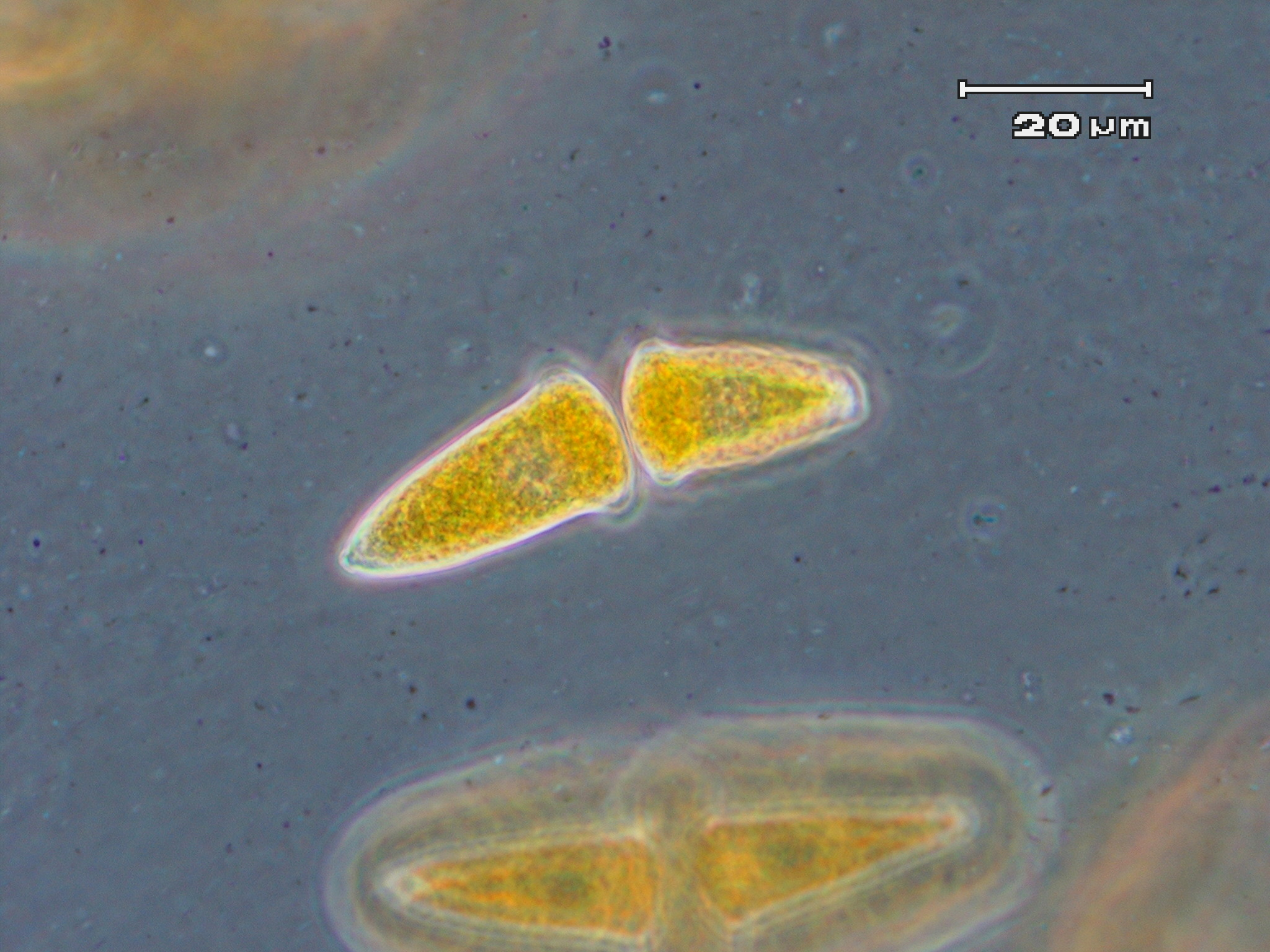
Two-celled teliospore

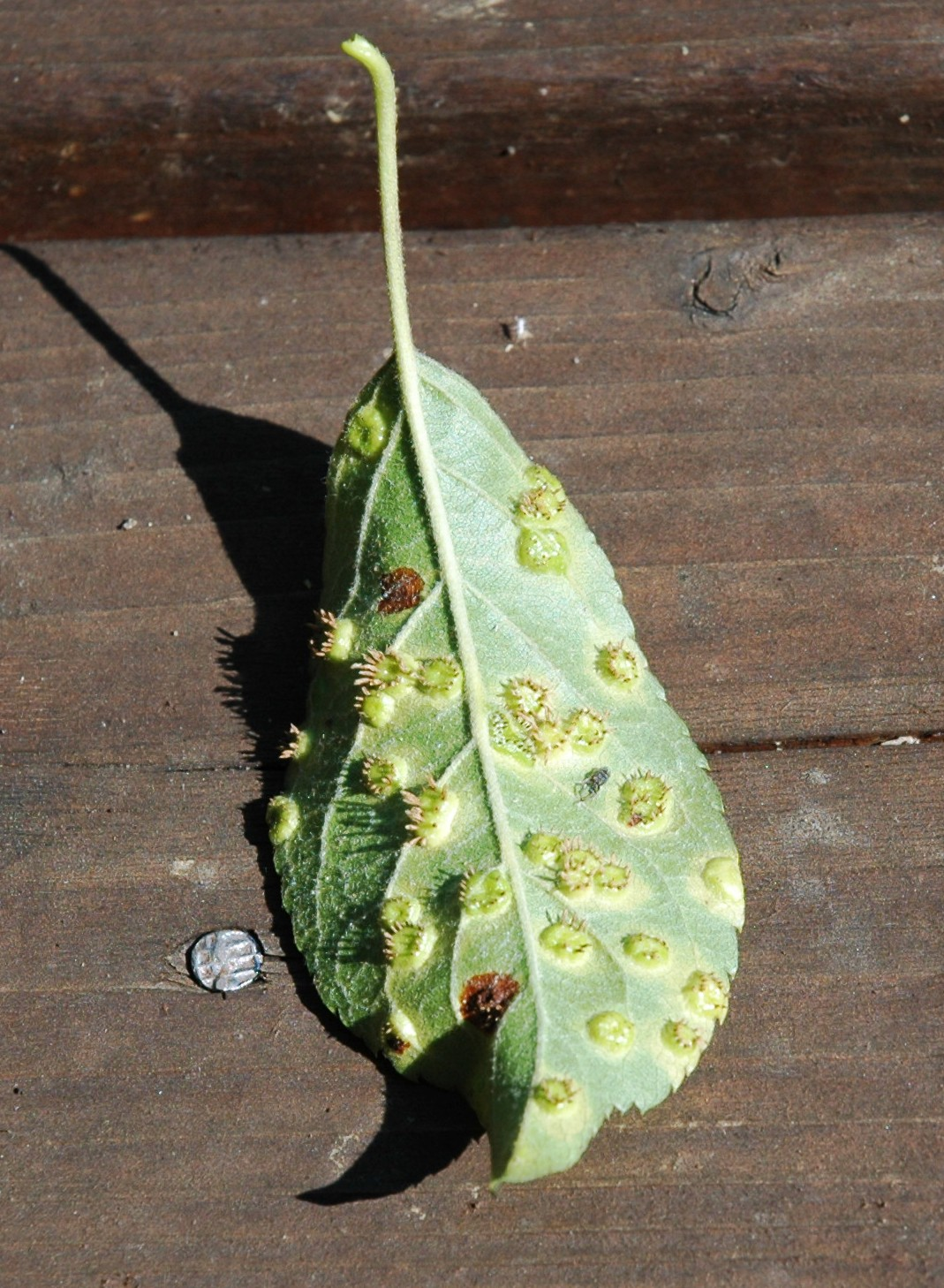
Cedar apple rust on a crab apple showing stomata

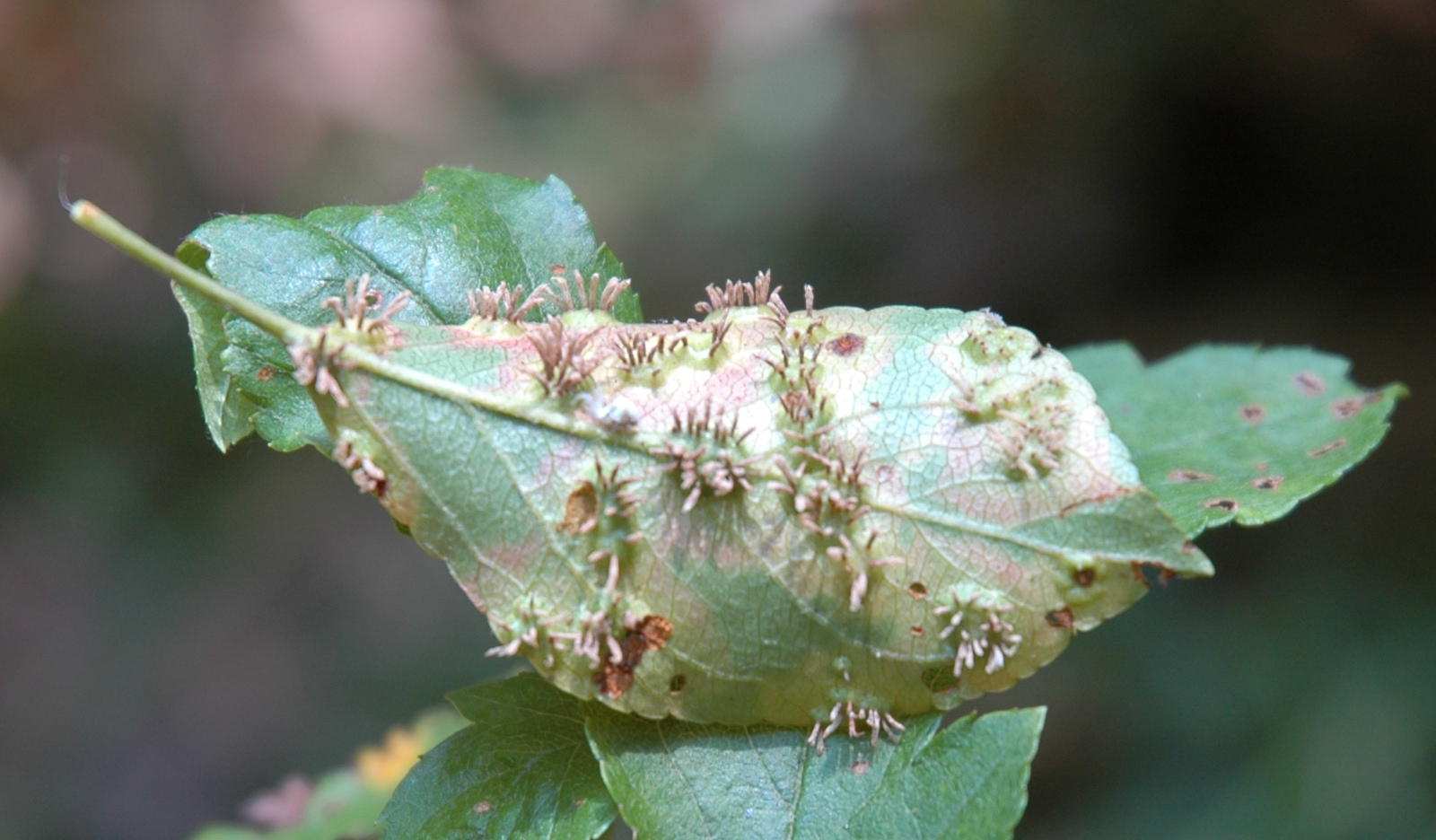
Cedar apple rust on a crab apple showing stomata

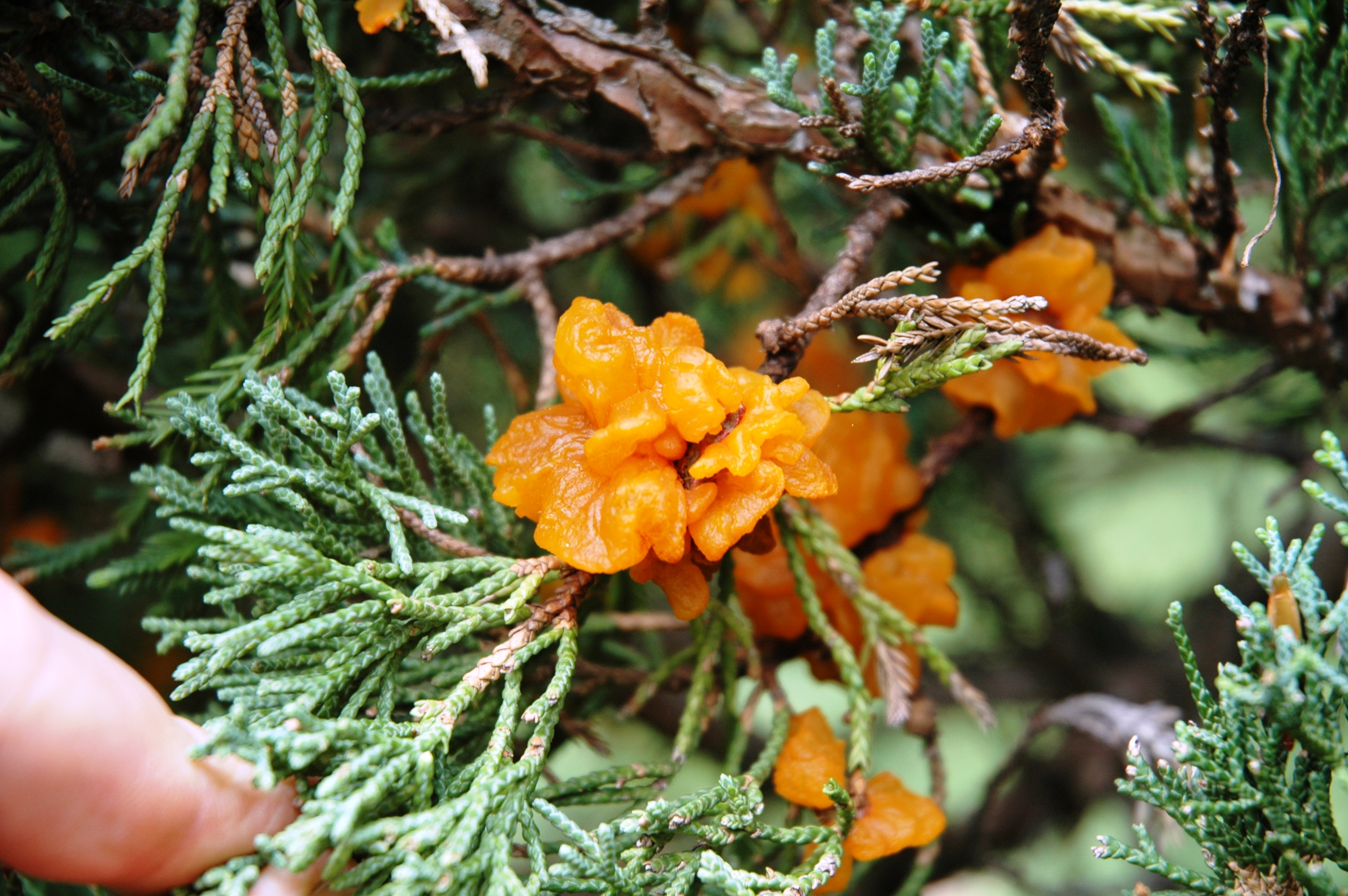
Cedar apple rust on a shimpaku juniper

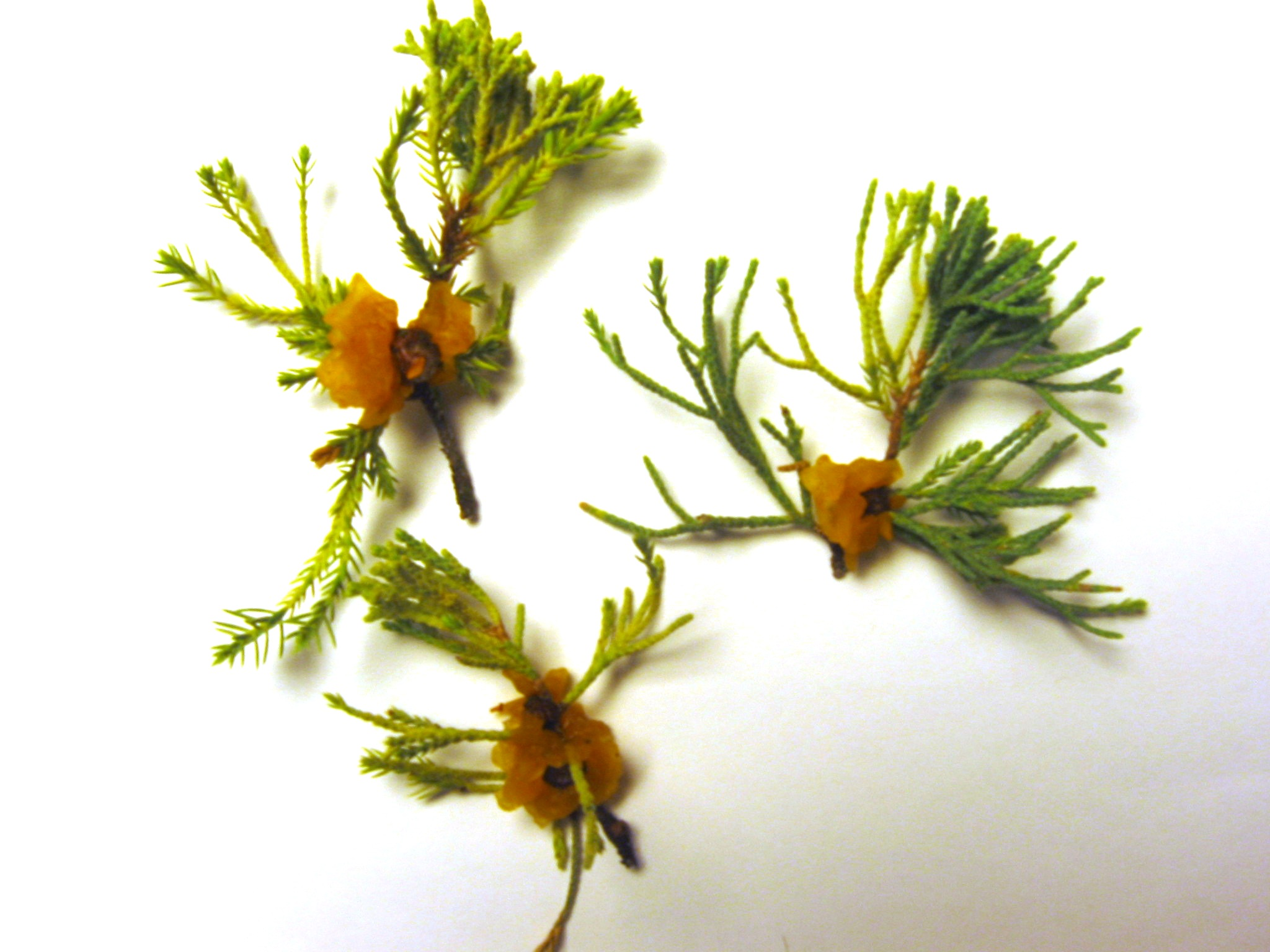
Cedar apple rust on a J. procumbens 'Nana'

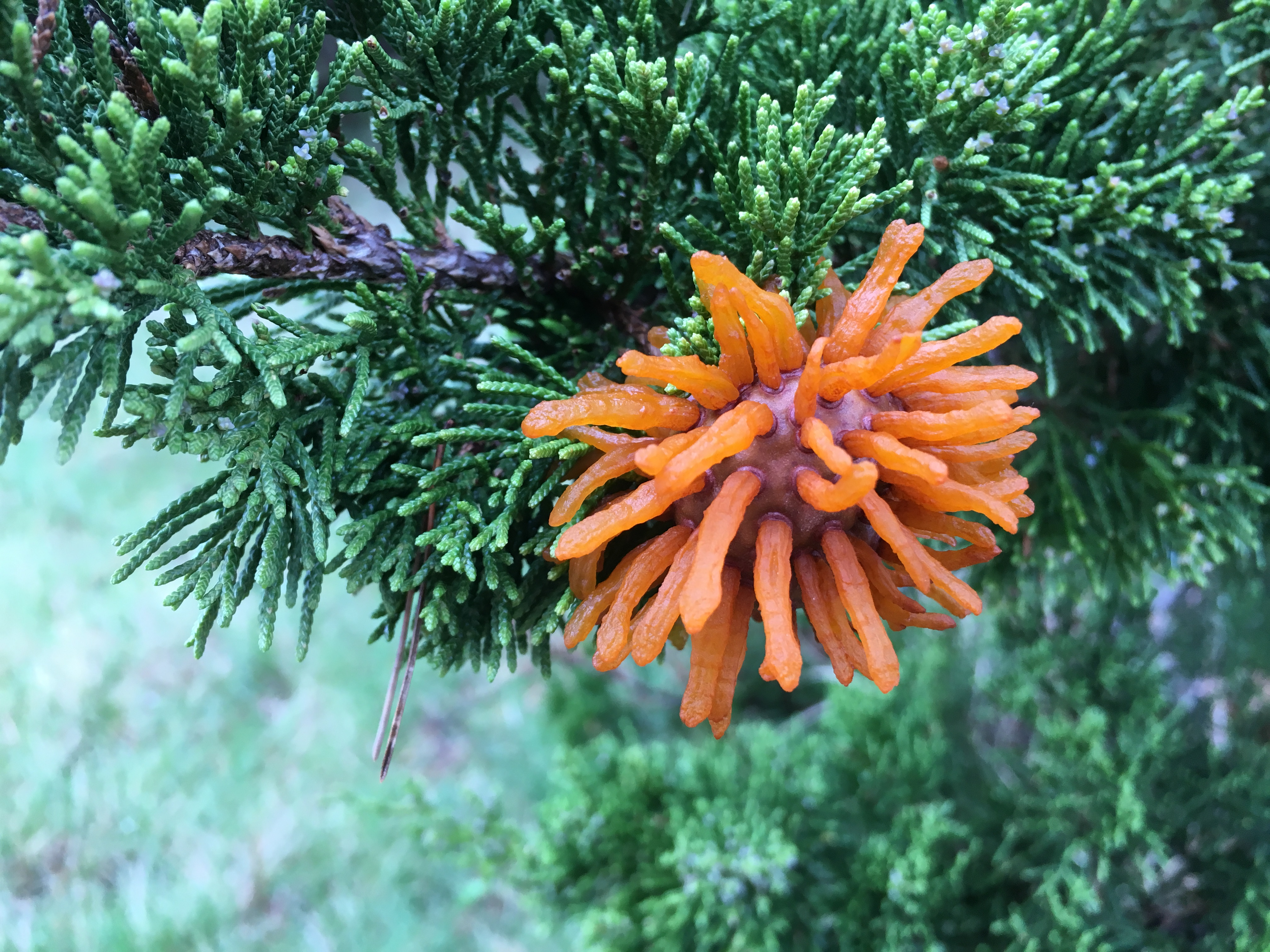
Gall with telial horns
