= Telium =

Structure produced by rust fungi as part of the reproductive cycle

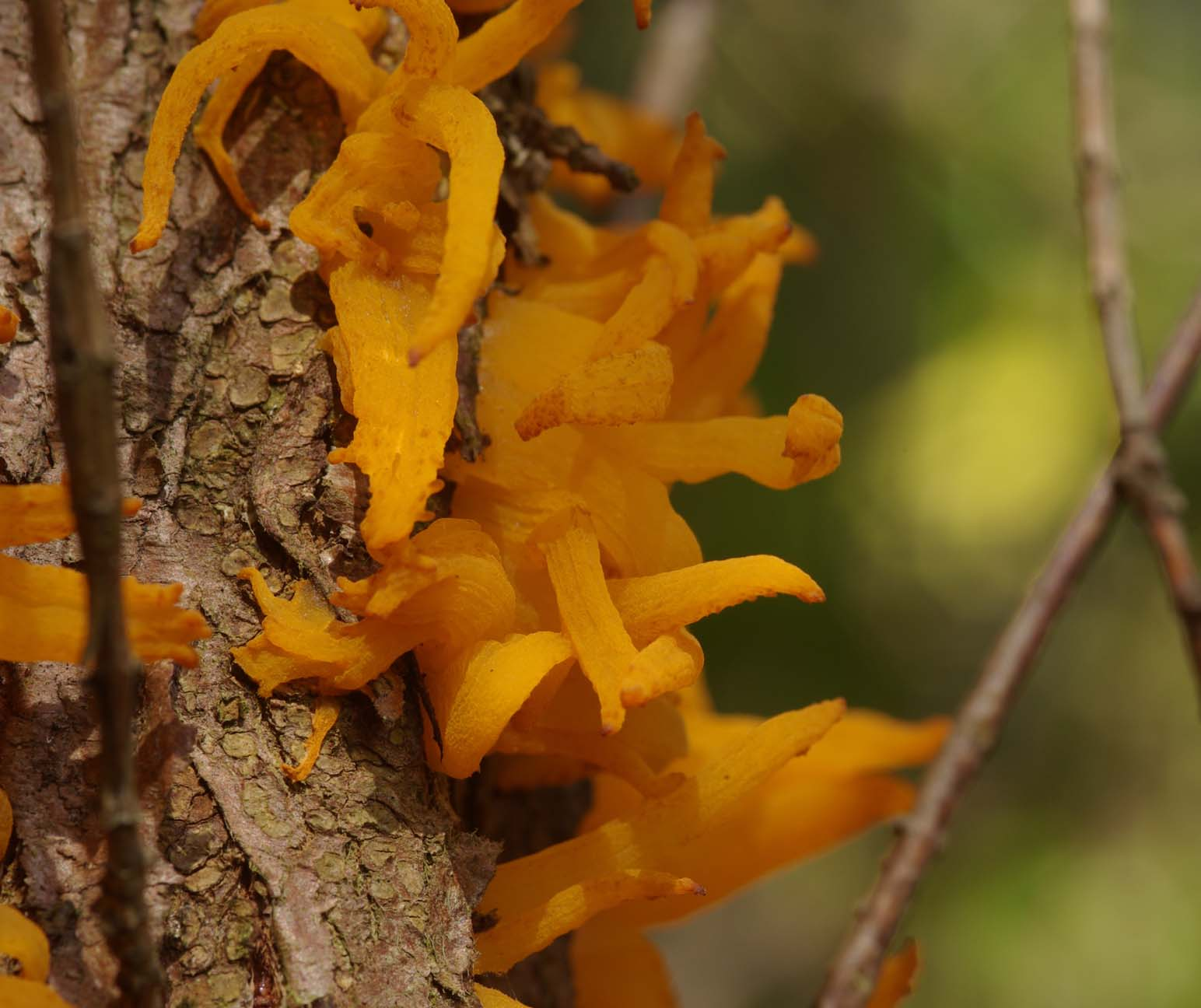
Close-up of Gymnosporangium clavariiforme telia emerging from Juniperus communis bark

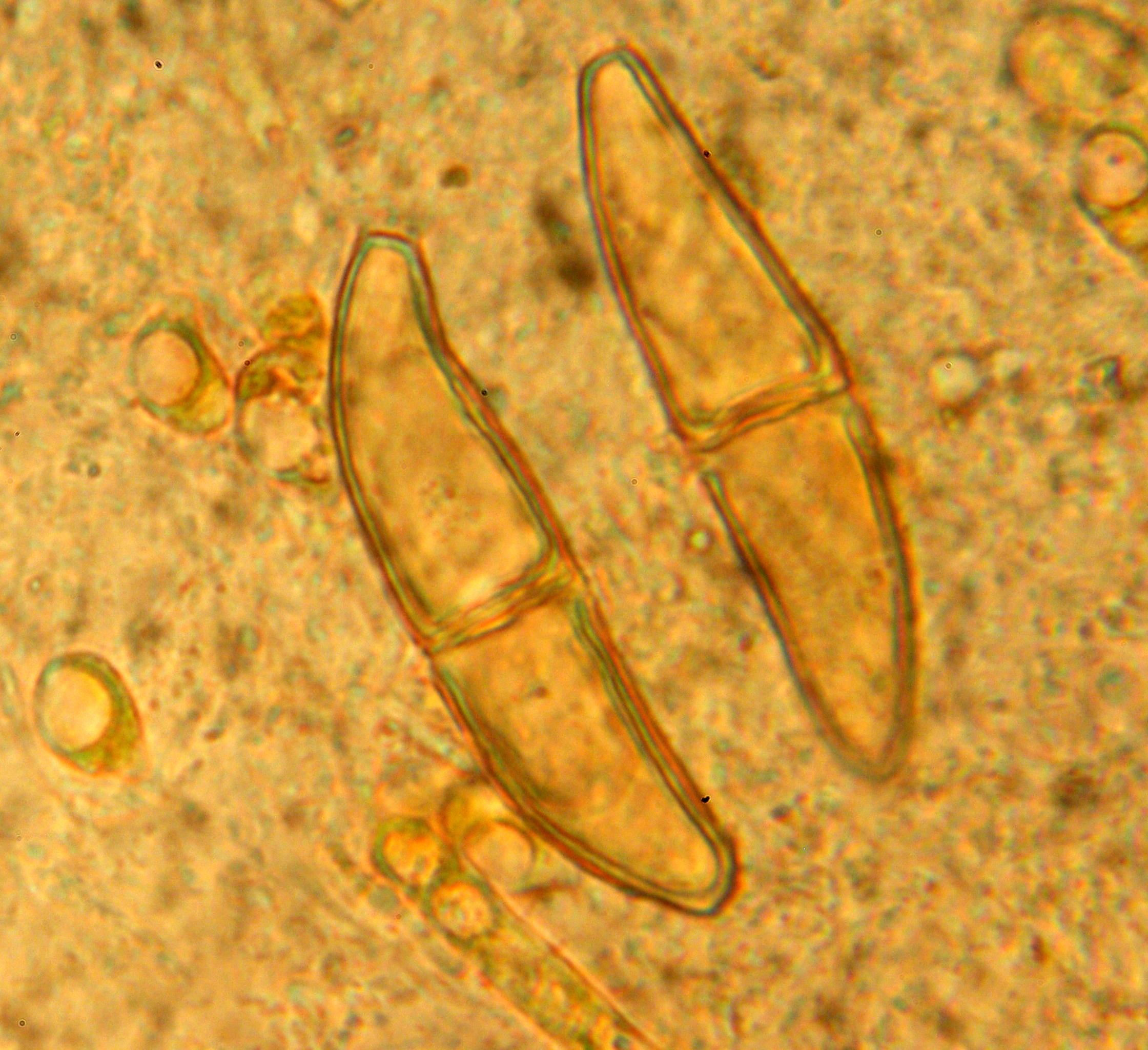
Micrograph of two teliospores from telia of Gymnosporangium clavariiforme

Telium, plural telia, are structures produced by rust fungi as part of the reproductive cycle. They are typically yellow or orange drying to brown or black and are exclusively a mechanism for the release of teliospores which are released by wind or water to infect the alternate host in the rust life-cycle. The telial stage provides an overwintering strategy in the life cycle of a parasitic heteroecious fungus by producing teliospores; this occurs on cedar trees. A primary aecial stage is spent parasitizing a separate host plant which is a precursor in the life cycle of heteroecious fungi. Teliospores are released from the telia in the spring. The spores can spread many kilometers through the air, however most are spread near the host plant.

== Host plants ==
There are a number of plants that can be infected by the telial stage. Therefore, the telial stage is considered a pathogen to those plants. A few specific plant pathogenic species are listed here with their hosts.

1. Puccinia graminis or known commonly as black stem rust. It infects many different cereal crops.
2. Gymnosporangium juniperi-virginianae. It infects the eastern red cedar. This is shown to the right.
3. Gymnosporangium sabinae. It infects pear trees.
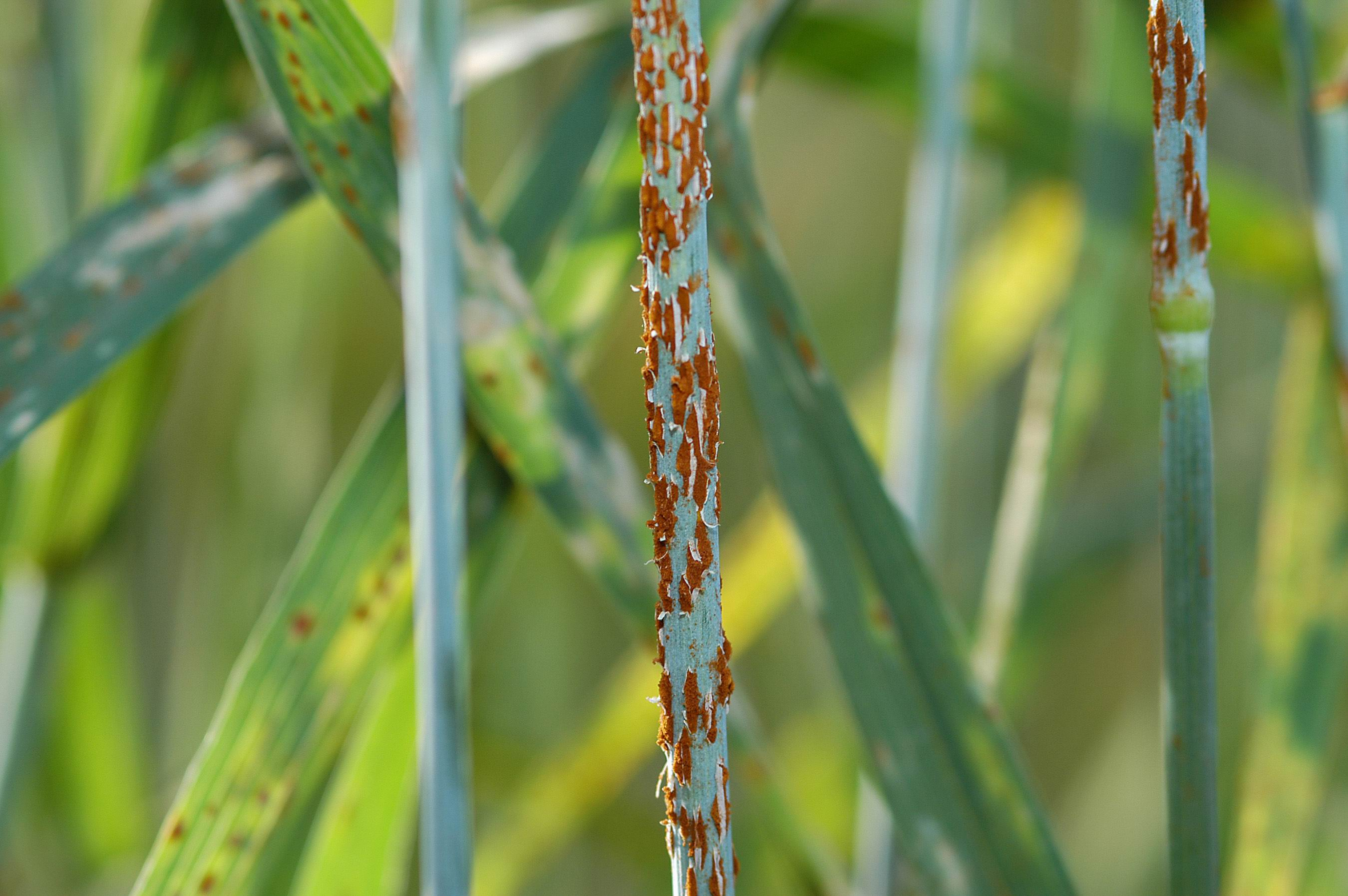
Puccinia graminis on wheat.

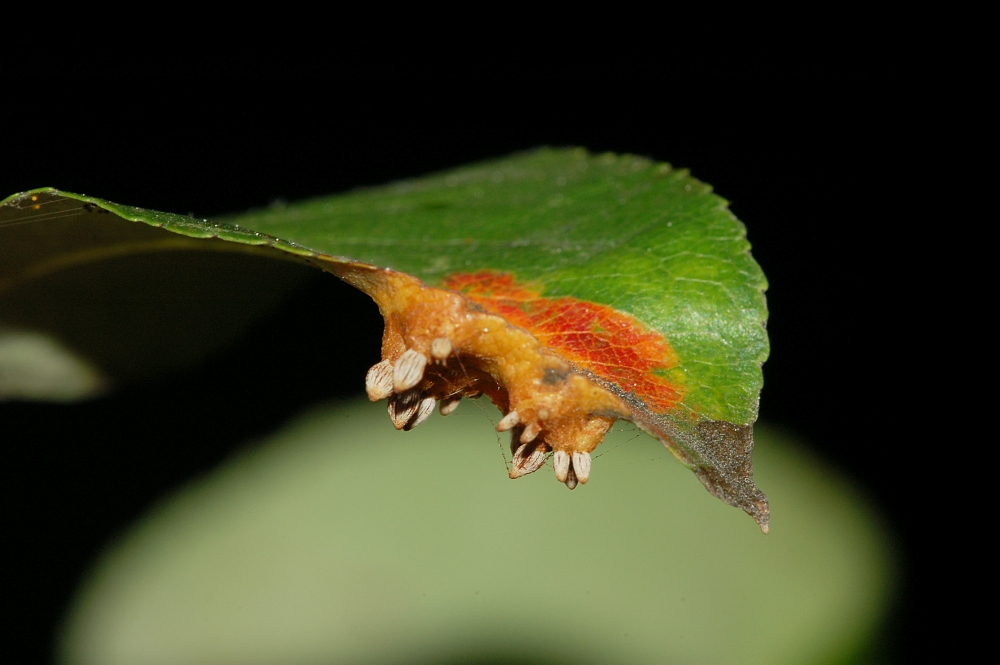
Gymnosporangium sabinae on a pear tree leaf.

== Spore stages ==
The life cycle of rust fungi can have up to five different spore stages and can get quite complex. These stages are:

- Stage 0: Pycniospores
- Stage I: Aeciospores
- Stage II: Urediniospores
- Stage III: Teliospores
- Stage IV: Basidiospores
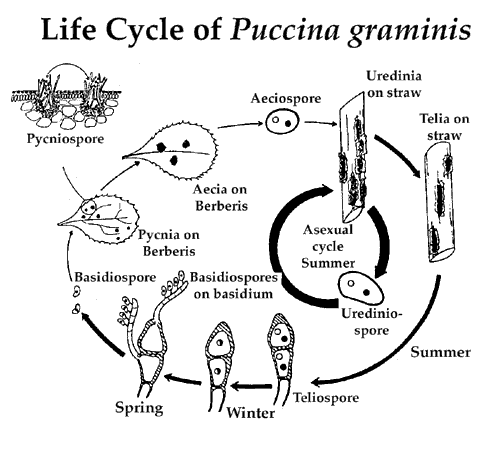
Life Cycle of Puccina graminis
