= Aeciospore =

Reproductive structure of a fungus

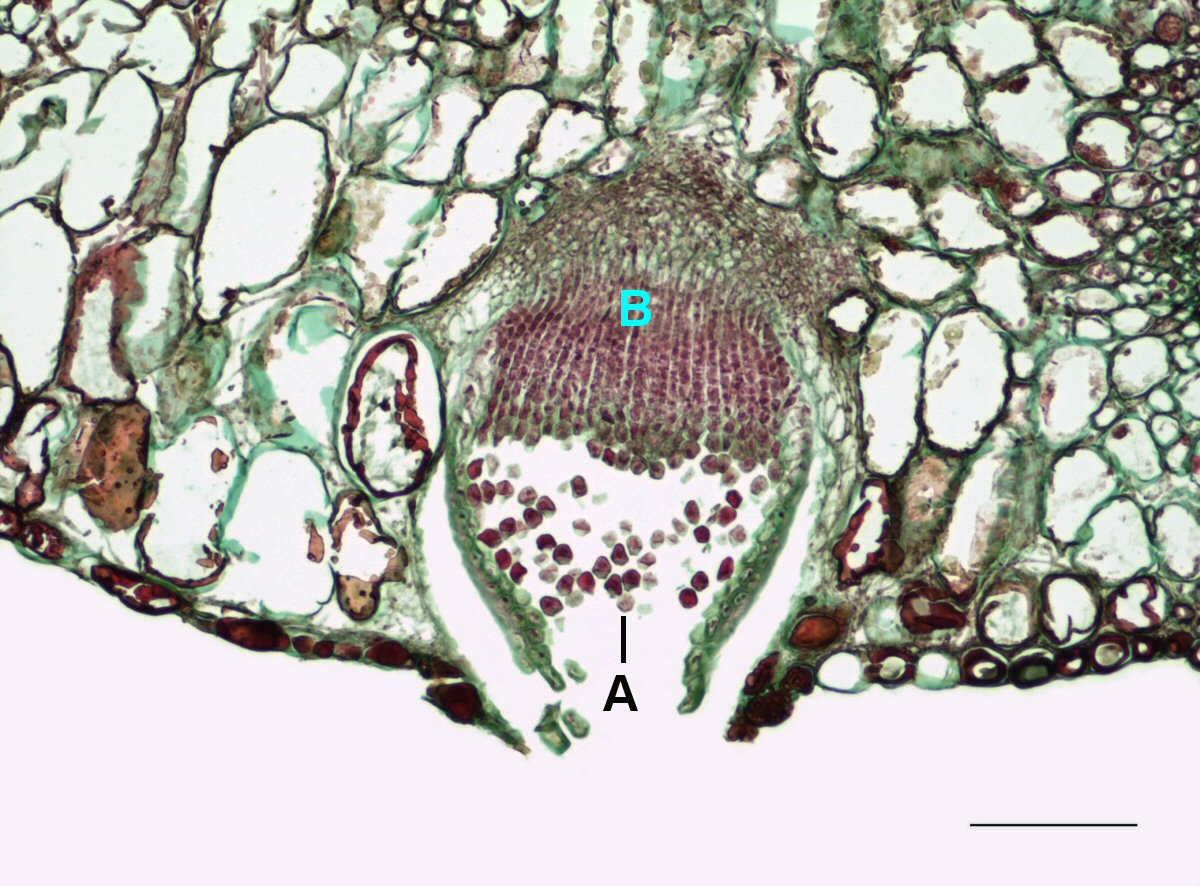
Light microscopy of Puccinia graminis with an aecium releasing its aeciospores through the broken leaf surface. A=Aeciospore, B=Aecium. Scale bar = 0.1 mm

Aeciospores are one of several different types of spores formed by rusts. They each have two nuclei and are typically seen in chain-like formations in the aecium.
