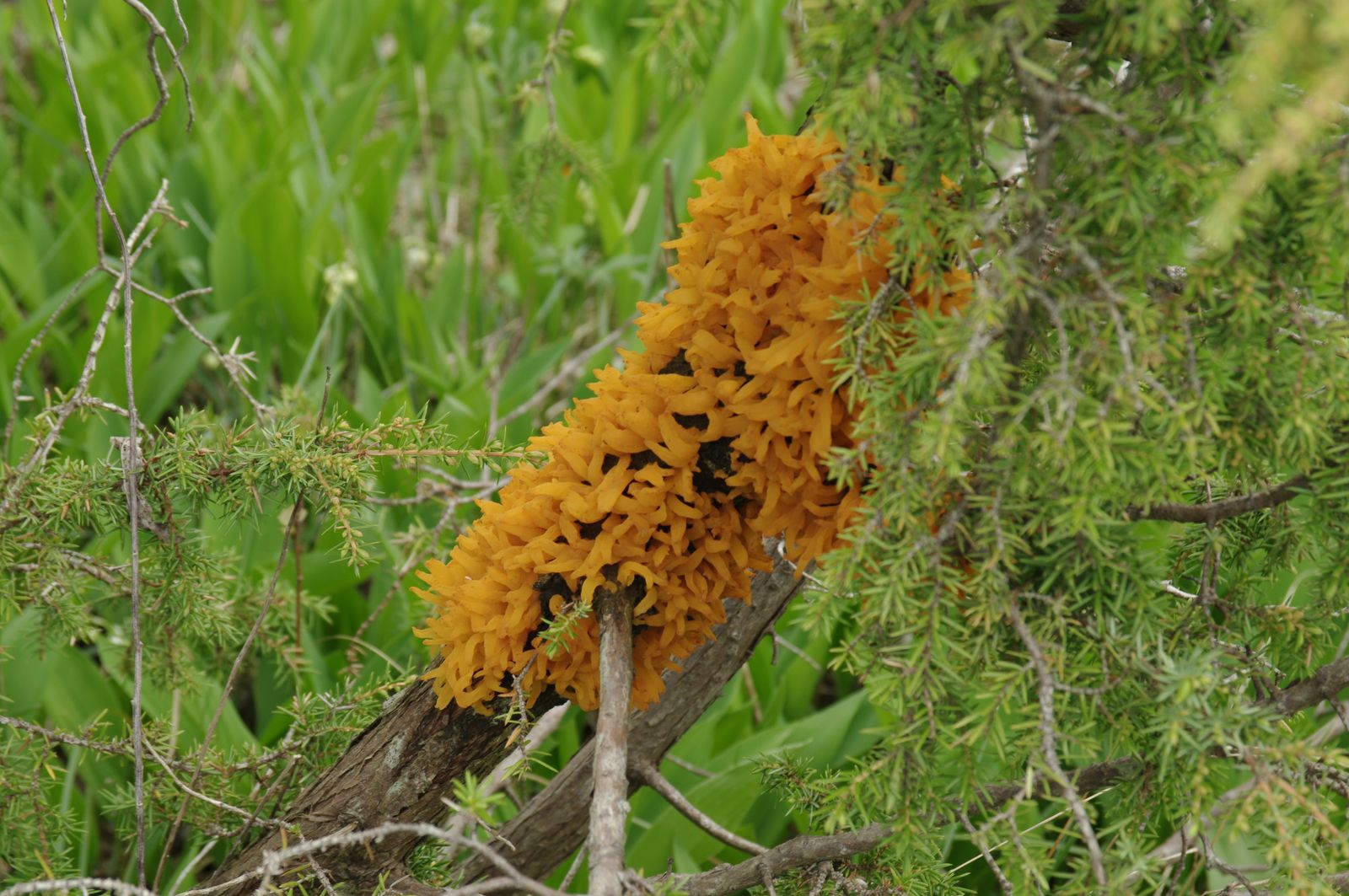
- Gymnosporangium juniperinum

Scientific classification
- Kingdom: Fungi
- Division: Basidiomycota
- Class: Pucciniomycetes
- Order: Pucciniales
- Family: Gymnosporangiaceae; P. Zhou & L. Cai, 2020. emend. Aime & McTaggart

Synonyms
- Gymnosporangieae Dietel

= Gymnosporangiaceae =

Family of fungi

The Gymnosporangiaceae are a family of rust fungus genera, in the order Pucciniales, based on the type genus Gymnosporangium. The classification of fungal taxa based on only morphological characteristics has long been recognised as problematical, so this order was reviewed over a long-term study using three DNA loci (including type species wherever possible) and published in 2021.

== Genera ==
In their 2021 review, Aime and McTaggart included the following genera:

1. Gymnosporangium R. Hedw. ex DC
2. Gymnotelium
3. probably Peridiopsora
