= Fusicladium =

Scientific classification
- Domain: Eukaryota
- Kingdom: Fungi
- Division: Ascomycota
- Class: Dothideomycetes
- Order: Pleosporales
- Family: Venturiaceae
- Genus: Fusicladium; Bonorden, 1851

Species
- See text

Genus of fungi

Fusicladium is a genus of fungus in the family Venturiaceae. Specimens of Fusicladium may be found across the world. Many species are plant pathogens, infecting at least 52 plant genera including apple trees, pea plants, and peach trees. These infectious species are each often host-specific, meaning they can only survive on specific species of plant.

The precise taxonomy of the genus is still under investigation. DNA analysis has shown that species from the genera Pollaccia and Spilocaea belong in a single clade with Fusicladium. Fusicladium is sometimes written Fusicladium s.l. (meaning "Fusicladium in the wider sense") to reflect this.

== Species ==
Species in the genus Fusicladium include:

- Fusicladium aconiti
- Fusicladium africanum
- Fusicladium ahmadii
- Fusicladium alopecuri
- Fusicladium amelanchieris
- Fusicladium amoenum
- Fusicladium amygdali
- Fusicladium anethi
- Fusicladium angelicae
- Fusicladium aplectri
- Fusicladium aromaticum
- Fusicladium aronici
- Fusicladium artemisiae
- Fusicladium ascyrinum
- Fusicladium asiaticum
- Fusicladium asperatum
- Fusicladium astericola
- Fusicladium asteroma
- Fusicladium baptisiae
- Fusicladium betulae
- Fusicladium betuligenum
- Fusicladium bicolor
- Fusicladium brevicatenatum
- Fusicladium brevipes
- Fusicladium brevipus
- Fusicladium britannicum
- Fusicladium butleri
- Fusicladium butyrospermi
- Fusicladium byrsonimatis
- Fusicladium caducum
- Fusicladium caesalpiniae
- Fusicladium caricae
- Fusicladium caricinum
- Fusicladium carpineum
- Fusicladium carpini
- Fusicladium carpophilum
- Fusicladium caruanianum
- Fusicladium caryigenum
- Fusicladium caryogenum
- Fusicladium catenosporum
- Fusicladium caulicola
- Fusicladium cecropiae
- Fusicladium cephalanthi
- Fusicladium cerasi
- Fusicladium chanousii
- Fusicladium consors
- Fusicladium convolvularum
- Fusicladium cordae
- Fusicladium coreopsidis
- Fusicladium crataegi
- Fusicladium cynanchi
- Fusicladium dearnessianum
- Fusicladium dendriticum
- Fusicladium depressum
- Fusicladium destruens
- Fusicladium diedickeanum
- Fusicladium diospyri
- Fusicladium dubiosum
- Fusicladium effusum
- Fusicladium elasticae
- Fusicladium elegans
- Fusicladium ephedrae
- Fusicladium eriobotryae
- Fusicladium eucalypti
- Fusicladium eucalypticola
- Fusicladium euphorbiae
- Fusicladium fagi
- Fusicladium fagopyri
- Fusicladium fasciculatum
- Fusicladium fautreyi
- Fusicladium fici
- Fusicladium fraxini
- Fusicladium fuliginosum
- Fusicladium fuscescens
- Fusicladium gardeniae
- Fusicladium gnaphaliatum
- Fusicladium grayianum
- Fusicladium gynoxidicola
- Fusicladium hariotianum
- Fusicladium heterosporum
- Fusicladium heveae
- Fusicladium hippophaës
- Fusicladium humile
- Fusicladium hyphopodioides
- Fusicladium intermedium
- Fusicladium jacarandae
- Fusicladium junci
- Fusicladium kaki
- Fusicladium lageniforme
- Fusicladium lalandi
- Fusicladium lathyrinum
- Fusicladium levieri
- Fusicladium lini
- Fusicladium livistoniae
- Fusicladium lonicerae
- Fusicladium lysimachiae
- Fusicladium macrosporium
- Fusicladium macrosporum
- Fusicladium maculicola
- Fusicladium mandshuricum
- Fusicladium martianoffianum
- Fusicladium matsushimae
- Fusicladium melanconioides
- Fusicladium minutulum
- Fusicladium miserum
- Fusicladium monardae
- Fusicladium myrticola
- Fusicladium nashicola
- Fusicladium nebulosum
- Fusicladium obducens
- Fusicladium oleagineum
- Fusicladium orbiculatum
- Fusicladium orchidis
- Fusicladium paraamoenum
- Fusicladium parasiticum
- Fusicladium peltigericola
- Fusicladium peucedani
- Fusicladium phillyreae
- Fusicladium photinicola
- Fusicladium photiniicola
- Fusicladium pini
- Fusicladium pirinum
- Fusicladium pisicola
- Fusicladium pomi
- Fusicladium pongamiae
- Fusicladium poricola
- Fusicladium praecox
- Fusicladium proteae
- Fusicladium pruni
- Fusicladium psammicola
- Fusicladium psoraleae
- Fusicladium punctiforme
- Fusicladium pyracanthae
- Fusicladium pyrinum
- Fusicladium pyrorum
- Fusicladium radiosa
- Fusicladium radiosum
- Fusicladium ramoconidii
- Fusicladium ramulosum
- Fusicladium rhodense
- Fusicladium robiniae
- Fusicladium romellianum
- Fusicladium ruthenicum
- Fusicladium saliciperdum
- Fusicladium salicis
- Fusicladium schnablianum
- Fusicladium scillae
- Fusicladium scribnerianum
- Fusicladium sicilianum
- Fusicladium sorghi
- Fusicladium spiraeae
- Fusicladium statices
- Fusicladium stuckertii
- Fusicladium subsessile
- Fusicladium tectonicola
- Fusicladium tenue
- Fusicladium theae
- Fusicladium transversum
- Fusicladium tremulae
- Fusicladium triostei
- Fusicladium vanillae
- Fusicladium variabile
- Fusicladium veronicae
- Fusicladium virescens
- Fusicladium virgaureae
- Fusicladium viticis
