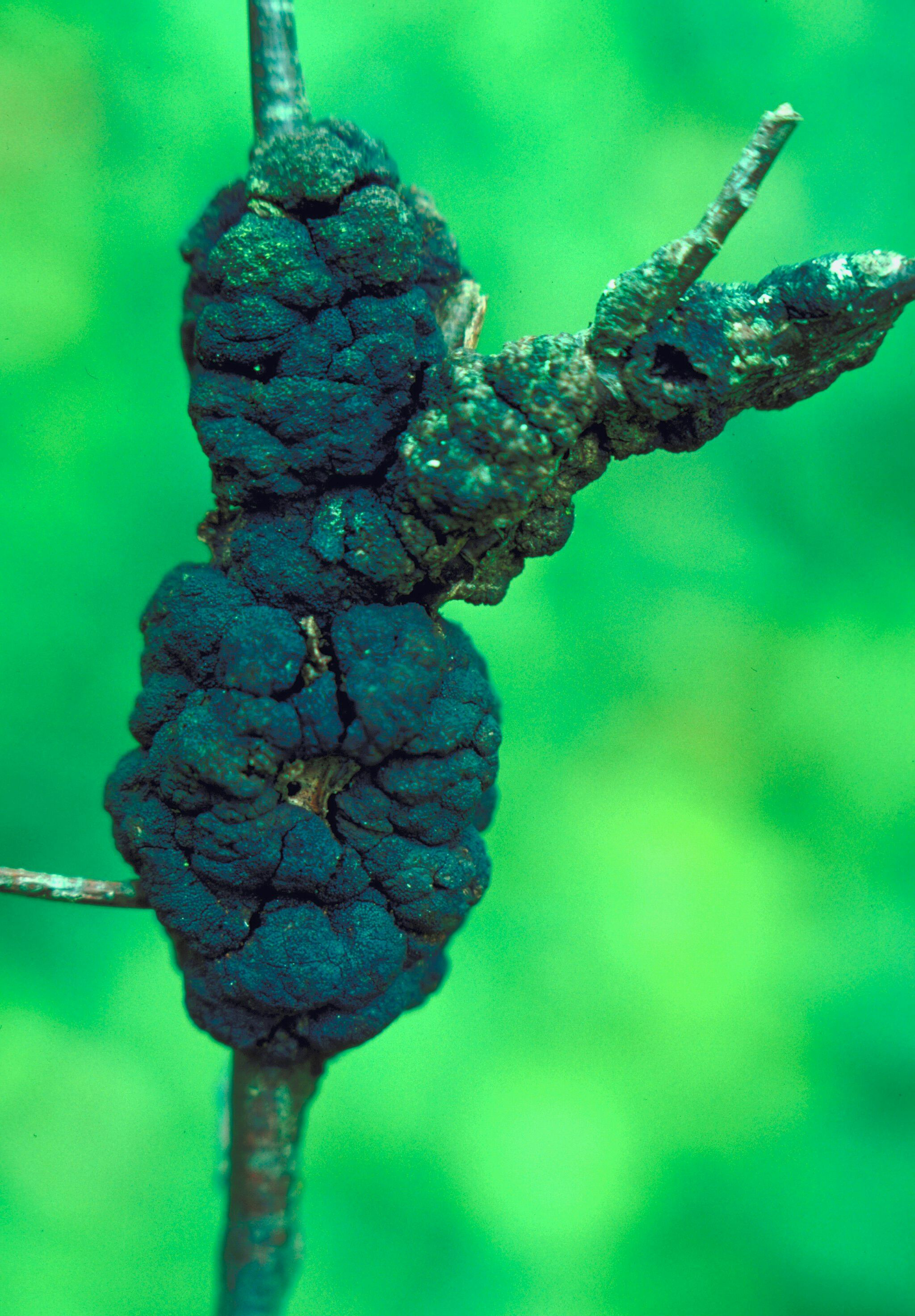
- black knot on cherry

Scientific classification
- Kingdom: Fungi
- Division: Ascomycota
- Class: Dothideomycetes
- Order: Venturiales
- Family: Venturiaceae
- Genus: Dibotryon
- Species: D. morbosum

Binomial name
- Dibotryon morbosum (Schwein.) Theiss. & Syd., 1915

Synonyms
- Apiosporina morbosa (Schwein.) van Arx

= Dibotryon morbosum =

Species of fungus

Dibotryon morbosum or Apiosporina morbosa is a plant pathogen, which is the causal agent of black knot. It affects members of the Prunus genus such as cherry, plum, apricot, and chokecherry trees in North America. The disease produces rough, black growths that encircle and kill the infested parts, and provide habitat for insects.

The disease was first described in 1821 in Pennsylvania, but has spread across North America. While it was one of the most destructive diseases of plum and cherry trees in the late 19th century, today it is relatively well controlled in many cultivated areas and seen primarily in poorly managed orchards, or where strongly established, including in the wild. Many urban centres in North America have black knot control programs.

Black knot occurs only on the woody parts of trees, primarily on twigs and branches, but can spread to larger limbs and even the trunk. Olive-green swellings from the disease are visible in the late spring; as it spreads and matures, typically by autumn, rough black knots circle and kill affected parts. The knots vary in diameter from one inch to one foot (2.5–30 cm). Older knots can kill trees by promoting insect infestations.

The most common treatments are pruning infected parts during the winter and spraying buds with a fungicide. Nearby wild plants with the disease must also be treated.

== Hosts and symptoms ==
Dibotryon morbosum is a fungus that affects the genus Prunus. Included in this genus are multiple species of trees and shrubs, such as: Dibotryon morbosum infects are Prunus serotina (wild cherry trees), Prunus persica (peach trees), Prunus domestica (plum trees), and Prunus cerasus (sour cherry trees). The main symptom of Dibotryon morbosum is its “knot-like” gall structure. These knots can vary in size from anywhere to 13–305 mm (0.5–12 in) long, and up to 51 mm (2 in) wide. This fungus is typically diagnosed by these large black galls at the site of infection. The first signs of these symptoms are noticed during the winter because leaves are not obscuring the view. The first noticeable symptoms are small, light brown swellings. The next season, these swellings will turn dark green and have a velvety texture. The green swellings will darken and harden into the large black knots. These swellings often start as green in color during the beginning of the summer season and become black at the end of summer.

== Disease cycle ==
Dibotryon morbosum has a relatively simple disease cycle. In the spring, after overwintering in a previous host, the fungus produces ascospores, which are stored in a fruiting structure known as the pseudothecia. These ascospores then get dispersed by the wind and rain until they find a susceptible host. They typically infect their host on wounded tissue or shoots. The infection is not systemic but does grow and spread from the initial infection site. Symptoms are typically not noticeable in the season of initial infection, as the fungus grows inside the host. Throughout the summer, conidia are produced which also get dispersed by wind and rain. Conidia are asexual spores that help the fungus to spread within a given growing season. The conidia help the fungus germinate and produce other generations of the fungus, after, the conidia also helps the spores disperse by releasing them and allowing them to disperse through the wind. The fungus then overwinters within the shoots and tissue of the host. It then produces ascospores in the spring to begin the cycle anew, but only after it has grown on its host for two winters. It will not produce ascospores the first season after initial infection but will continue to produce asexual conidia.

== Pathogenesis ==
Dibotryon morbosum produces pseudothecia, fruiting structures that are embedded in the black stroma on the surface of the gall. In the spring, two winters after initial infection, the fungus produces sexual spores called ascospores. The ascospores mature during the early spring of the infection's second season and are forcibly discharged into the air during rain events. The spores are distributed short distances on wind currents and through rain splashing. The anamorph, or asexual stage, produces abundant olive-green conidia during the summer on the surfaces of one-year-old knots. The infection capabilities of the conidia are quite limited. Therefore, management strategies are focused on ascospore development and infection processes.

== Environment ==
The fungus Dibotryon morbosum overwinters in the knots and once the ascospores are released. The spores are released during the wet periods of spring. The wind and rain carry these spores to infect young saplings or wounded branches. The fungus favors warm and wet weather with any temperature within 60–80 degrees Fahrenheit as it is the most ideal for dissemination, germination, and infection of new plant tissue. Rainfall is also significant because it causes the spores to be released and begin infecting new plant tissue. The splashing of the rain helps transfer the ascospores along with air currents.

== Management ==
There are several ways that Dibotryon morbosum is managed. The first way to manage this pathogen is to choose strains that are genetically resistant. There are several resistant species of the genus Prunus that can be used, such as Prunus maackii, Prunus armeniaca, and Prunus triloba. Cultural management can also be used to help prevent Dibotryon morbosum. Removing the source of inoculum, ascospores, by pruning plants can be effective in managing this fungus. Winter is the best time to look for galls since there are no leaves to obscure. By removing the galls, the ascospores will not mature and spread to healthy tissues. Pruning the branches should happen before spring as that is the time the buds break. It is also important to consider where Prunus species are planted. Areas that are known to have had issues with Dibotryon morbosum should be avoided because the black knot is a widespread fungal disease and will easily attack new growth and cause deterioration of plant and fruit growth.

Chemical management can also be an effective way to manage Dibotryon morbosum. Fungicides can be used, but they are recommended for use only in severe cases. Additionally, fungicides will be effective only if the source of inoculum is no longer present. Fungicides are only recommended for sites with valuable trees or very severe cases of the black knot. The fungicide will work as a protectant only if the cultural practices that were before mentioned are being done as well.
