= Phaeocryptopus =

Scientific classification
- Kingdom: Fungi
- Division: Ascomycota
- Class: Dothideomycetes
- Order: Venturiales
- Family: Venturiaceae
- Genus: Phaeocryptopus; Naumov

Type species
- Phaeocryptopus abietis Naumov

Species
- P. abietis P. araucariae P. australis P. nudus P. pinastri P. podocarpi P. saxegotheae

Genus of fungi

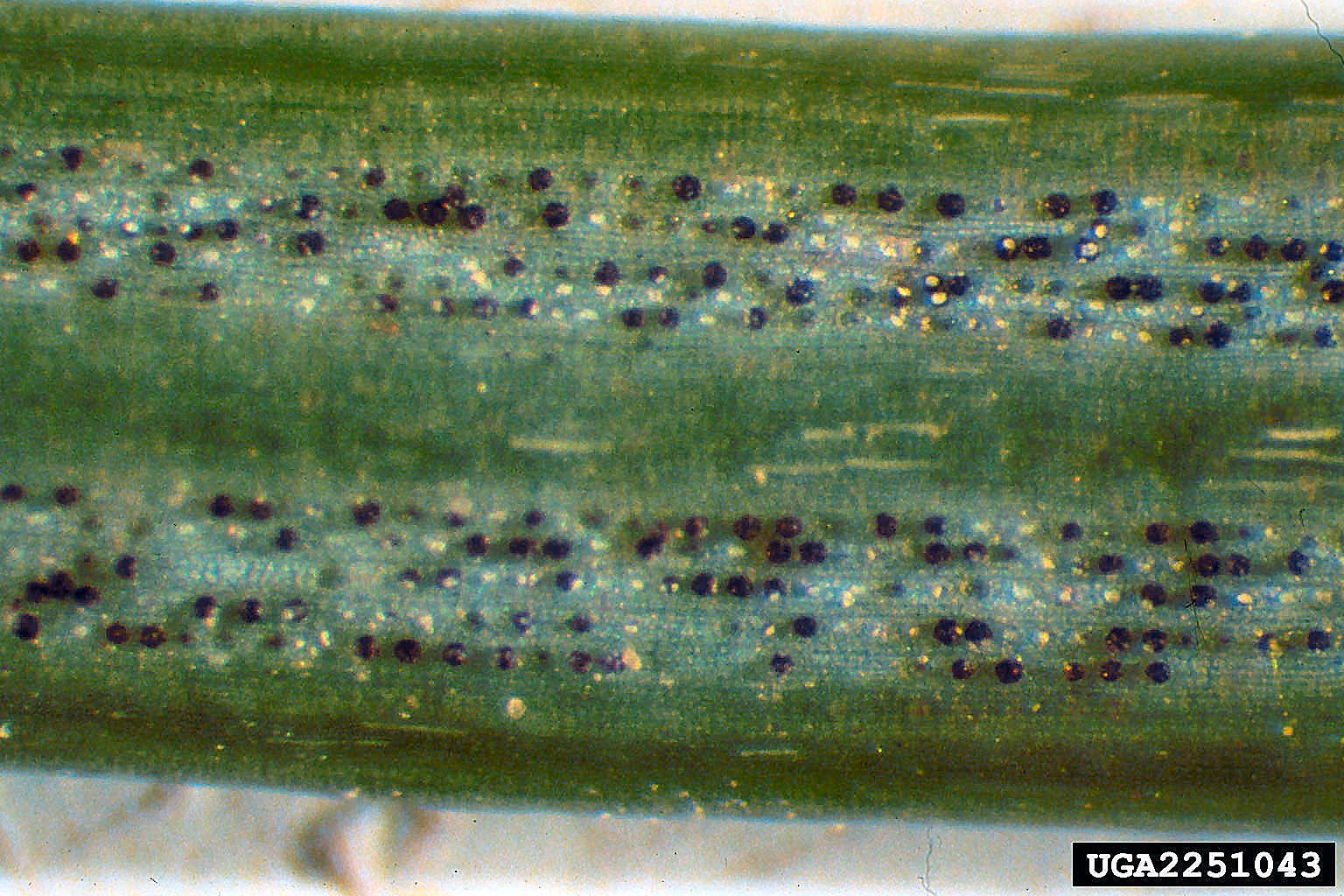
Swiss needle cast Phaeocryptopus gaeumannii (T. Rohde) Petr. Descriptor: Fruiting Bodies Description: close-up view of infected needle Image location: United States

Phaeocryptopus is a genus of fungi in the family Venturiaceae.
