= Fusicladium pisicola =

Scientific classification
- Kingdom: Fungi
- Division: Ascomycota
- Class: Dothideomycetes
- Order: Pleosporales
- Family: Venturiaceae
- Genus: Fusicladium
- Species: F. pisicola

Binomial name
- Fusicladium pisicola Linford, (1926)

Species of fungus

Fusicladium pisicola is a species of fungal plant pathogen affecting pea plants.
