= List of pear diseases =

The following is a list of diseases of pears (Pyrus communis).

== Bacterial diseases ==
Bacterial diseases
Crown gall	Agrobacterium tumefaciens
Fire blight	Erwinia amylovora
Pseudomonas blossom blast and canker	Pseudomonas syringae pv. syringae
Pear decline	Phytoplasma

== Fungal diseases ==
Fungal diseases
Alternaria fruit rot	Alternaria spp.
Anthracnose canker and bull's-eye rot	Pezicula malicorticus Cryptosporiopsis curvispora [anamorph]
Armillaria root rot (shoestring root rot)	Armillaria mellea Rhizomorpha subcorticalis [anamorph]
Bitter rot	Glomerella cingulata Colletotrichum gloeosporioides [anamorph]
Black rot, leaf spot and canker	Botryosphaeria obtusa Sphaeropsis malorum [anamorph]
Black spot (of Japanese pear)	Alternaria alternata
Blister canker	Helminthosporium papulosum
Blister disease	Coniothecium chomatosporum
Blue mold rot	Penicillium spp. Penicillium expansum
Botrytis spur and blossom blight	Botrytis cinerea Botryotinia fuckeliana [teleomorph]
Brown rot	Monilinia fructicola Monilinia laxa
Cladosporium fruit rot	Cladosporium herbarum Mycosphaerella tassiana [teleomorph]
Clitocybe root rot (mushroom root rot)	Armillaria tabescens = Clitocybe tabescens
Coprinus rot	Coprinopsis psychromorbida
Dematophora root rot (Rosellinia root rot)	Rosellinia necatrix Dematophora necatrix [anamorph]
Diplodia canker	Botryosphaeria stevensii = Physalospora malorum Diplodia mutila [anamorph]
Elsinoe leaf and fruit spot	Elsinoe piri Sphaceloma pirinum [anamorph]
European canker	Nectria galligena Cylindrocarpon heteronemum [anamorph]
Fabraea leaf and fruit spot	Diplocarpon mespili = Fabraea maculata Entomosporium mespili [anamorph]
Fly speck	Schizothyrium pomi Zygophiala jamaicensis [anamorph]
Gibberella canker	Gibberella baccata Fusarium lateritium [anamorph]
Gray mold rot	Botrytis cinerea
Late leaf spot	Cercospora minima
Mucor fruit rot	Mucor spp. Mucor piriformis
Mycosphaerella leaf spot (ashy leaf spot and fruit spot)	Mycosphaerella pyri = Mycosphaerella sentina Septoria pyricola [anamorph]
Nectria twig blight (coral spot)	Nectria cinnabarina Tubercularia vulgaris [anamorph]
Pear scab	Venturia pyrina Fusicladium pyrorum [anamorph]
Perennial canker	Neofabraea perennans Cryptosporiopsis perennans [anamorph]
Phyllosticta leaf spot	Phyllosticta sp.
Phytophthora crown and root rot (sprinkler rot)	Phytophthora cactorum
Pink mold rot	Trichothecium roseum = Cephalothecium roseum
Powdery mildew	Podosphaera leucotricha
Pythium dieback	Pythium spp.
Rhizopus rot	Rhizopus stolonifer
Rust, American hawthorne	Gymnosporangium globosum
Rust, Kern's pear	Gymnosporangium kernianum
Rust, Pacific Coast pear	Gymnosporangium libocedri
Rust, pear trellis (European pear rust)	Gymnosporangium fuscum
Rust, Rocky Mountain pear	Gymnosporangium nelsonii
Side rot	Phialophora malorum
Silver leaf	Chondrostereum purpureum
Sooty blotch	Gloeodes pomigena
Thread blight (Hypochnus leaf blight)	Corticium stevensii = Pellicularia koleroga = Hypochnus ochroleucus
Valsa canker	Valsa ceratosperma Cytospora sacculus [anamorph]
Wood rot	Trametes versicolor and various basidiomycetes
Xylaria root rot	Xylaria spp.

== Miscellaneous diseases and disorders ==
Miscellaneous diseases and disorders
Alfalfa greening (green stain)	Unknown
Bitter pit	Localized calcium deficiency
Black end	Water imbalance
Black speck (skin speckling)	Associated with low oxygen in storage
Blossom blast	Boron deficiency
Brown core	High CO_{2}
Core breakdown (Bartlett)	Senescence
Cork spot	Associated with calcium deficiency
Green stain	Unknown
Internal bark necrosis	Unknown
Mealy core (d`Anjou)	Senescence
Pink end (Bartlett)	Preharvest low temperature
Rosette	Unknown
Scald	Senescence

== Nematodes, parasitic ==
Nematodes, parasitic
Dagger, American	Xiphinema americanum
Dagger	Xiphinema riveri Xiphinema vuittenezi
Lesion	Pratylenchus spp. Pratylenchus penetrans
Pin	Paratylenchus spp.
Root-knot	Meloidogyne spp.

== Viruslike diseases ==
Viruslike diseases
Flemish beauty corky pit	Virus suspected
Pear blister canker	Virus suspected
Pear decline	Phytoplasma
Pear freckle pit	Virus suspected
Pear red mottle	Virus suspected
Pear ring pattern mosaic	Virus suspected
Pear rough bark	Virus suspected
Pear stony pit	Virus suspected
Pear vein yellows	Virus suspected
Quince bark necrosis	Virus suspected
Quince sooty ring spot	Virus suspected
Quince stunt	Virus suspected
Quince yellow blotch	Virus suspected
