= Acantharia (disambiguation) =

The Acantharia are a group of radiolarian protozoa.

Acantharia may also refer to:

- Acantharia (fungus), a genus in the 'Venturiaceae family
