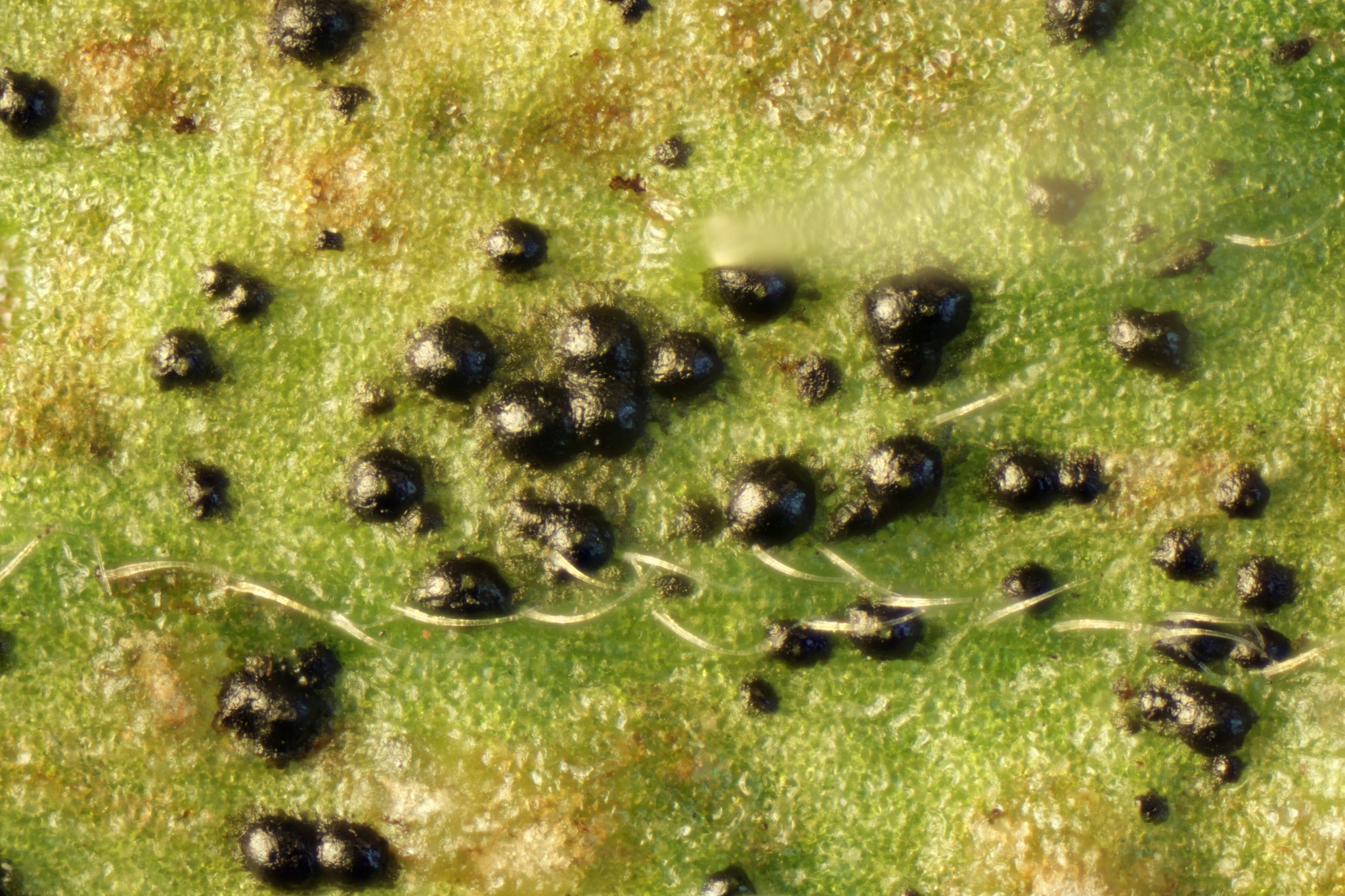
- Coleroa robertiani

Scientific classification
- Kingdom: Fungi
- Division: Ascomycota
- Class: Dothideomycetes
- Order: Venturiales
- Family: Venturiaceae
- Genus: Coleroa; Rabenh.

= Coleroa =

Genus of fungi

Coleroa is a genus of fungi belonging to the family Venturiaceae.

The species of this genus are found in Eurasia and Northern America.

== Species ==
Species:

- Coleroa alchemillae (Grev.) G.Winter (1885)
- Coleroa aliculariae Gonz.Frag. (1916)
- Coleroa boukokoensis Saccas (1951)
- Coleroa caulicola (Rostr.) Sivan. (1977)
- Coleroa chaetomium (Kunze) Rabenh. (1850)
- Coleroa circinans (Fr.) G. Winter (1885)
- Coleroa coffeicola Saccas (1953)
- Coleroa concinna (Petr.) M.E. Barr (1989)
- Coleroa crepidis Togashi & Katsuki (1952)
- Coleroa daphnes Balf.-Browne (1955)
- Coleroa graminis A.L. Guyot (1946)
- Coleroa hageniae (Castell.) Eboh & Cain (1987)
- Coleroa hepaticicola Racov. (1942)
- Coleroa himalayensis (C. Bachm.) Sivan. (1977)
- Coleroa inconspicua Bubák (1915)
- Coleroa lebeckiae (Verwoerd & Dippen.) Arx (1962)
- Coleroa maydicola Saccas (1951)
- Coleroa papyricola Saccas (1953)
- Coleroa plantaginis (Ellis) M.E. Barr (1968)
- Coleroa polylopha (Syd.) E. Müll. (1962)
- Coleroa pusiola (P. Karst.) Sivan. (1975)
- Coleroa rhododendri (Tengwall) Săvul. & Eliade (1959)
- Coleroa rhynchosiae (Kalchbr. & Cooke) E. Müll. (1962)
- Coleroa robertiani (Fr.) E. Müll. (1962)
- Coleroa rubicola (Ellis & Everh.) E. Müll. (1962)
- Coleroa rubi-idaei (Höhn.) Sacc. (1928)
- Coleroa senniana (Sacc.) Arx (1962)
- Coleroa spinarum Höhn. (1905)
- Coleroa sporoboli (H.C. Greene) M.E. Barr (1968)
- Coleroa venturioides Speschnew (1904)
