= Atopospora =

Scientific classification
- Kingdom: Fungi
- Division: Ascomycota
- Class: Dothideomycetes
- Order: Venturiales
- Family: Venturiaceae
- Genus: Atopospora; Petr.

Type species
- Atopospora betulina (Fr.) Petr.

Genus of fungi

Atopospora is a genus of fungi in the family Venturiaceae. This is a monotypic genus, containing the single species Atopospora betulina.
