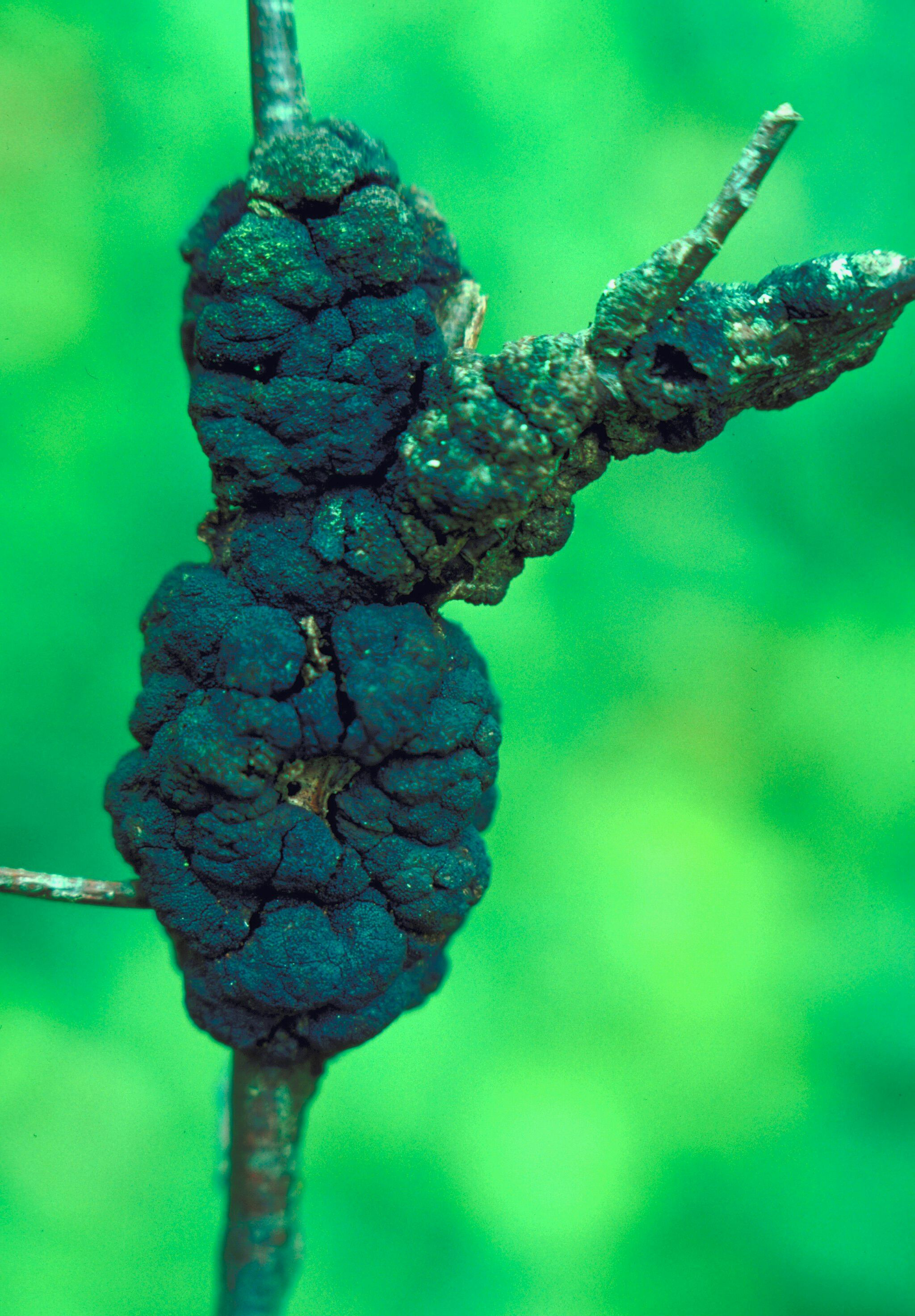

Scientific classification
- Domain: Eukaryota
- Kingdom: Fungi
- Division: Ascomycota
- Class: Dothideomycetes
- Order: Pleosporales
- Family: Venturiaceae
- Genus: Dibotryon; Theiss. & Syd.

Type species
- Dibotryon morbosum (Schwein.) Theiss. & Syd.

= Dibotryon =

Genus of fungi

Dibotryon is a genus of fungi in the family Venturiaceae.
