= Crotone drimydis =

Scientific classification
- Domain: Eukaryota
- Kingdom: Fungi
- Division: Ascomycota
- Class: Dothideomycetes
- Order: Pleosporales
- Family: Venturiaceae
- Genus: Crotone
- Species: C. drimydis

Binomial name
- Crotone drimydis (Lév.) Theiss. & Syd.

Synonyms
- Bagnisiella drimydis (Lév.) Sacc.; Dothidea drimydis Lév.; Munkiella drimydis (Lév.) Speg.

Species of fungus

Crotone drimydis is a species of fungus in the family Venturiaceae.
