= Caproventuria =

Scientific classification
- Kingdom: Fungi
- Division: Ascomycota
- Class: Dothideomycetes
- Order: Pleosporales
- Family: Venturiaceae
- Genus: Caproventuria; U. Braun

Type species
- Caproventuria hanliniana (U. Braun & Feiler) U. Braun

Genus of fungi

Caproventuria is a genus of fungi in the family Venturiaceae. This is a monotypic genus, containing the single species Caproventuria hanliniana.
