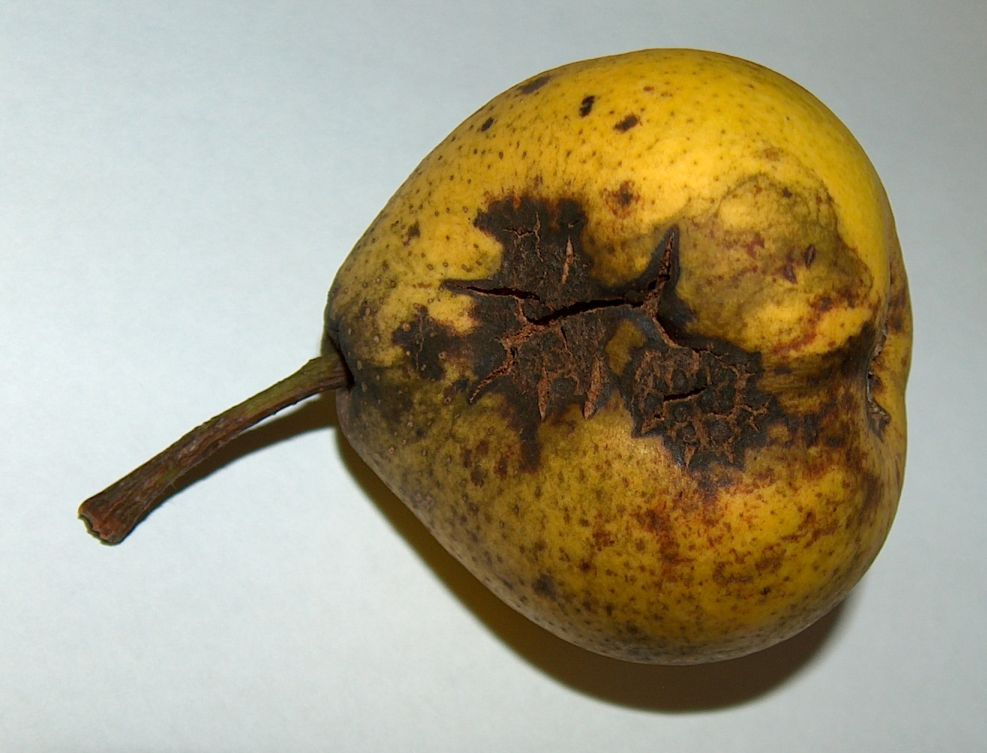
- Pear scab

Scientific classification
- Domain: Eukaryota
- Kingdom: Fungi
- Division: Ascomycota
- Class: Dothideomycetes
- Order: Pleosporales
- Family: Venturiaceae
- Genus: Venturia
- Species: V. pyrina

Binomial name
- Venturia pyrina Aderh. (1896)

Synonyms
- Endostigme pyrina (Aderh.) Syd. (1923); Fusicladium pyrorum (Lib.) Fuckel [as 'pirinum'], (1870); Fusicladium virescens Bonord. (1851); Helminthosporium pyrorum Lib. [as 'Helmisporium'], (1832); Megacladosporium pyrinum (Lib.) Vienn.-Bourg. (1949); Venturia pyrina f. piri Bref. (1891)

= Venturia pyrina =

Species of fungus

Venturia pyrina is a species of fungus in the family Venturiaceae. A plant pathogen, it causes scab or black spot of pear. It has a widespread distribution in temperate and subtropical regions wherever pears are grown.
