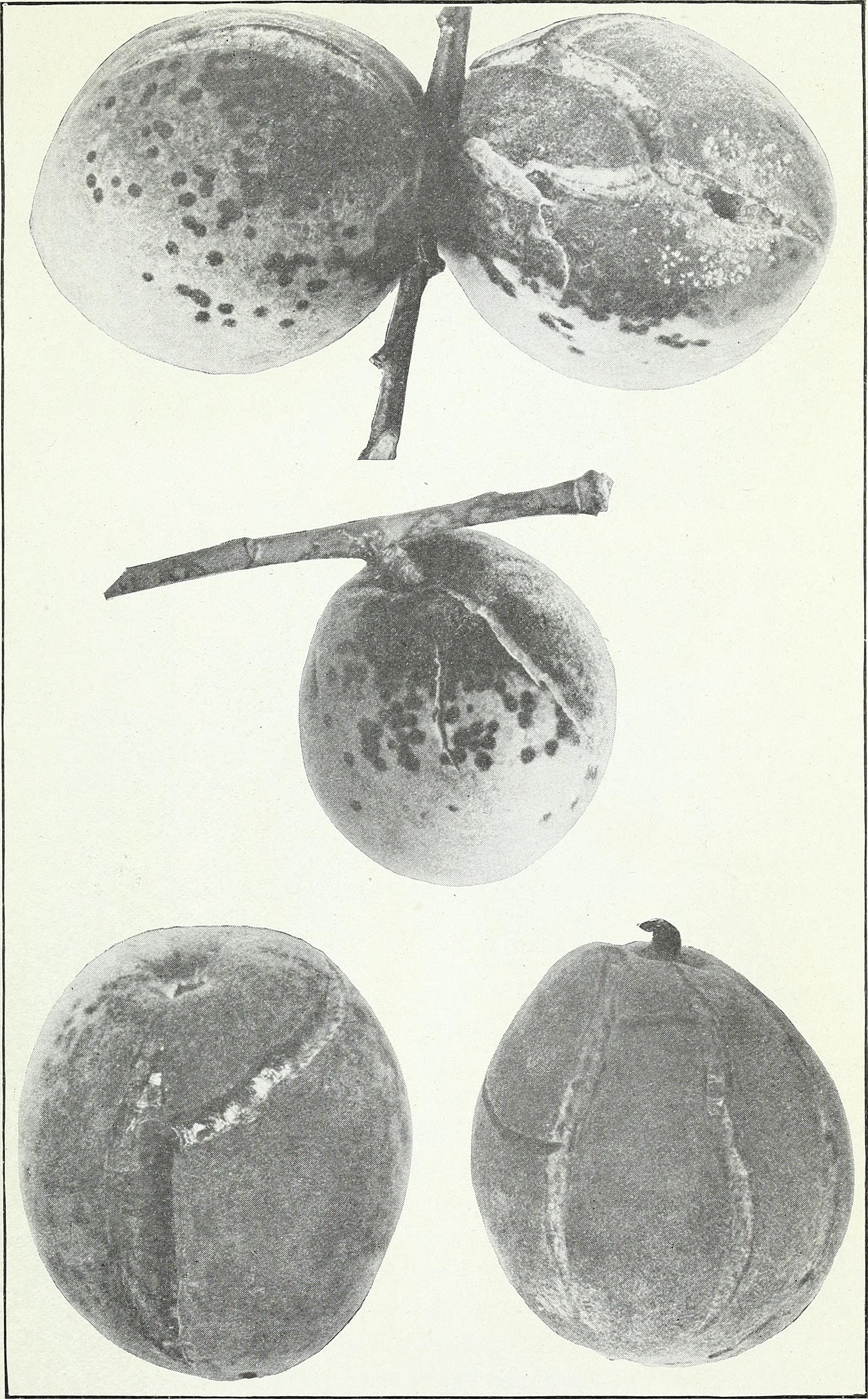
- Elberta peaches damaged by Venturia carpophila

Scientific classification
- Kingdom: Fungi
- Division: Ascomycota
- Class: Dothideomycetes
- Order: Pleosporales
- Family: Venturiaceae
- Genus: Venturia
- Species: V. carpophila

Binomial name
- Venturia carpophila E.E.Fisher (1961)

Synonyms
- Cladosporium carpophilum Fusicladium amygdali Ducomet (1907); Fusicladium carpophilum (Thum.) Oudem. (1900); Fusicladium pruni Ducomet (1907); Fusicladosporium carpophilum Megacladosporium carpophilum (Thum.) Viennot-Bourg. (1949); Thelephora vorticosa

= Venturia carpophila =

Species of fungus

Venturia carpophila is a species of fungus in the family Venturiaceae. A plant pathogen, it causes freckle, black spot, peach scab or black scab of peach. It has a cosmopolitan distribution. The species was described as new to science in 1961 by the Australian mycologist Eileen E. Fisher.
