= Valsa ceratosperma =

Scientific classification
- Kingdom: Fungi
- Division: Ascomycota
- Class: Sordariomycetes
- Order: Diaporthales
- Family: Valsaceae
- Genus: Valsa
- Species: V. ceratosperma

Binomial name
- Valsa ceratosperma (Tode) Maire, (1937)

Synonyms
- Cytospora capreae Cytospora fuckelii Cytospora rosarum Hypoxylon ceratospermum Sphaeria ceratosperma Sphaeria concamerata Sphaeria coronata Sphaeria decorticans Valsa ceratophora var. acericola Valsa ceratophora var. quercicola Valsa ceratophora var. rosarum Valsa concamerata Valsa cornicola Valsa coronata Valsa decorticans Valsa fuckelii Valsa hoffmannii Valsa horrida Valsa leiphaemioides Valsa mulleriana Valsa rosarum Valsa schweinitzii

Species of fungus

Valsa ceratosperma is a plant pathogen infecting apples and pears.

== See also ==
- List of apple diseases
- List of pear diseases
