= Pyrenobotrys =

Scientific classification
- Kingdom: Fungi
- Division: Ascomycota
- Class: Dothideomycetes
- Order: Pleosporales
- Family: Venturiaceae
- Genus: Pyrenobotrys; Theiss. & Syd.

Type species
- Pyrenobotrys conferta (Fr.) Theiss. & Syd.

Species
- P. compacta P. heliconiae

Genus of fungi

Pyrenobotrys is a genus of fungi in the family Venturiaceae.
