= Metacoleroa =

Scientific classification
- Kingdom: Fungi
- Division: Ascomycota
- Class: Dothideomycetes
- Order: Pleosporales
- Family: Venturiaceae
- Genus: Metacoleroa; Petr.

Type species
- Metacoleroa dickiei (Berk. & Broome) Petr.

Genus of fungi

Metacoleroa is a genus of fungi in the family Venturiaceae. A monotypic genus, it contains the single species Metacoleroa dickiei .
