= Gibbera =

Scientific classification
- Domain: Eukaryota
- Kingdom: Fungi
- Division: Ascomycota
- Class: Dothideomycetes
- Order: Pleosporales
- Family: Venturiaceae
- Genus: Gibbera; Fr.

Type species
- Gibbera vaccinii (Sowerby) Fr.

Genus of fungi

Gibbera is a genus of fungi in the family Venturiaceae. It was first described scientifically by Elias Magnus Fries in 1825.

== Species ==
- Gibbera andromedae
- Gibbera vaccinii
