= Lineostroma =

Scientific classification
- Kingdom: Fungi
- Division: Ascomycota
- Class: Dothideomycetes
- Order: Pleosporales
- Family: Venturiaceae
- Genus: Lineostroma; H.J. Swart

Type species
- Lineostroma banksiae (Cooke) H.J. Swart

Monotypic genus of fungi

Lineostroma is a genus of fungi in the family Venturiaceae; according to the 2007 Outline of Ascomycota, the placement in this family is uncertain. A monotypic genus, it contains the single species Lineostroma banksiae.
