= Lasiobotrys =

Scientific classification
- Kingdom: Fungi
- Division: Ascomycota
- Class: Dothideomycetes
- Order: Pleosporales
- Family: Venturiaceae
- Genus: Lasiobotrys; Kunze

Type species
- Lasiobotrys lonicerae Kunze

Genus of fungi

Lasiobotrys is a genus of fungi in the family Venturiaceae. This is a monotypic genus, containing the single species Lasiobotrys lonicerae.
