= Rhizogene =

Scientific classification
- Kingdom: Fungi
- Division: Ascomycota
- Class: Dothideomycetes
- Order: Pleosporales
- Family: Venturiaceae
- Genus: Rhizogene; Syd. & P. Syd.

Type species
- Rhizogene symphoricarpi (Syd. & P. Syd.) Syd. & P. Syd.

Species
- R. impressa R. symphoricarpi

Genus of fungi

Rhizogene is a genus of fungi in the family Venturiaceae.
