= Arkoola =

Scientific classification
- Domain: Eukaryota
- Kingdom: Fungi
- Division: Ascomycota
- Class: Dothideomycetes
- Order: Pleosporales
- Family: Venturiaceae
- Genus: Arkoola; J. Walker & Stovold
- Species: A. nigra

Binomial name
- Arkoola nigra J. Walker & Stovold

Genus of fungi

Arkoola is a genus of fungus in the family Venturiaceae. This is a monotypic genus, containing the single species Arkoola nigra.

== See also ==
- List of soybean diseases
