= Antennularia =

Scientific classification
- Kingdom: Fungi
- Division: Ascomycota
- Class: Dothideomycetes
- Order: Pleosporales
- Family: Venturiaceae
- Genus: Antennularia; Reichenb.

Type species
- Antennularia ericophila (Link) S. Hughes

Genus of fungi

Antennularia is a genus of fungi in the family Venturiaceae.
