= Polyrhizon =

Scientific classification
- Domain: Eukaryota
- Kingdom: Fungi
- Division: Ascomycota
- Class: Dothideomycetes
- Order: Pleosporales
- Family: Venturiaceae
- Genus: Polyrhizon; Theiss. & Syd.

Type species
- Polyrhizon terminaliae Syd. & P. Syd.

Species
- P. capparis P. cassipoureae P. celastri P. fernandoi P. pterocelastri P. synapheae P. terminaliae

Genus of fungi

Polyrhizon is a genus of fungi that has been placed in the family Venturiaceae; however, according to the 2007 Outline of Ascomycota, its placement within this family is uncertain.
