= Xiphinema vuittenezi =

Scientific classification
- Domain: Eukaryota
- Kingdom: Animalia
- Phylum: Nematoda
- Class: Enoplea
- Order: Dorylaimida
- Family: Longidoridae
- Genus: Xiphinema
- Species: X. vuittenezi

Binomial name
- Xiphinema vuittenezi Luc, Lima, Weischer & Flegg, 1964

Species of worm

Xiphinema vuittenezi is a plant pathogenic nematode infecting apple and pear.

== See also ==
- List of apple diseases
- List of pear diseases
