= Pseudoparodiella =

Scientific classification
- Kingdom: Fungi
- Division: Ascomycota
- Class: Dothideomycetes
- Order: Pleosporales
- Family: Venturiaceae
- Genus: Pseudoparodiella; F. Stevens

Type species
- Pseudoparodiella vernoniae F. Stevens

Genus of fungi

Pseudoparodiella is a genus of fungi in the family Venturiaceae. This is a monotypic genus, containing the single species Pseudoparodiella vernoniae.
