= Crotone (fungus) =

Scientific classification
- Domain: Eukaryota
- Kingdom: Fungi
- Division: Ascomycota
- Class: Dothideomycetes
- Order: Pleosporales
- Family: Venturiaceae
- Genus: Crotone; Theiss. & Syd.

Type species
- Crotone drimydis (Lév.) Theiss. & Syd.

Species
- C. drimydis; C. emmoti

Genus of fungi

Crotone is a genus of fungi in the family Venturiaceae.
