= Trichodothella =

Scientific classification
- Kingdom: Fungi
- Division: Ascomycota
- Class: Dothideomycetes
- Order: Pleosporales
- Family: Venturiaceae
- Genus: Trichodothella; Petr.

Type species
- Trichodothella blumeri Petr. ex S. Blumer

Genus of fungi

Trichodothella is a genus of fungi in the family Venturiaceae. This is a monotypic genus, containing the single species Trichodothella blumeri.
