= Botryostroma =

Scientific classification
- Kingdom: Fungi
- Division: Ascomycota
- Class: Dothideomycetes
- Order: Pleosporales
- Family: Venturiaceae
- Genus: Botryostroma; Höhn.

Type species
- Botryostroma inaequale (G. Winter) Höhn.

Genus of fungi

Botryostroma is a genus of fungi in the family Venturiaceae. This is a monotypic genus, containing the single species Botryostroma inaequale.
