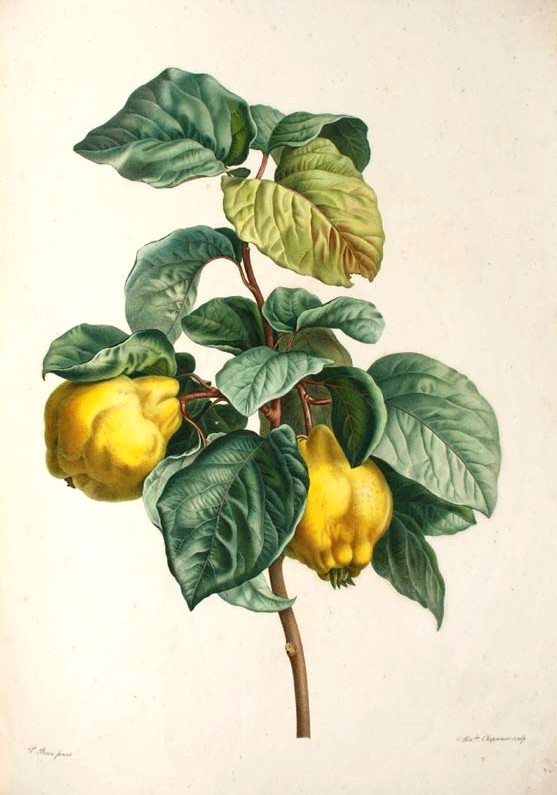
- Fruit and tree illustration by Pancrace Bessa, before 1835

Conservation status
- Least Concern (IUCN 3.1)

Scientific classification
- Kingdom: Plantae
- Clade: Tracheophytes
- Clade: Angiosperms
- Clade: Eudicots
- Clade: Rosids
- Order: Rosales
- Family: Rosaceae
- Subfamily: Amygdaloideae
- Tribe: Maleae
- Subtribe: Malinae
- Genus: Cydonia; Mill.
- Species: C. oblonga

Binomial name
- Cydonia oblonga Mill.

Synonyms
- C. vulgaris

= Quince =

Flowering plant and fruit

The quince (/ˈkwɪns/; Cydonia oblonga) is the sole member of the genus Cydonia in the Malinae subtribe (which contains apples, pears, and other fruits) of the Rosaceae family. It is a deciduous tree that bears hard, aromatic bright golden-yellow pome fruit, similar in appearance to a pear. Ripe quince fruits are hard, tart, and astringent. They are eaten raw or processed into jam, quince cheese, or alcoholic drinks.

The quince tree is sometimes grown as an ornamental plant for its attractive pale pink blossoms and as a miniature bonsai plant.

== Description ==
Quinces are shrubs or small trees up to 4 to 6 metres (13 to 20 feet) tall and 3 to 4.5 metres (10 to 15 feet) wide. Young twigs are covered in a grey down. The leaves are oval, and are downy on the underside. The solitary flowers, produced in late spring after the leaves, are white or pink.

The ripe fruit is aromatic but remains hard; gritty stone cells are dispersed through the flesh. It is larger than many apples, weighing as much as 1 kilogram (2.2 lb), often pear-shaped but sometimes roughly spherical.

The seeds contain nitriles, common in the seeds of the rose family. In the stomach, enzymes or stomach acid or both cause some of the nitriles to be hydrolysed and produce toxic hydrogen cyanide, which is a volatile gas. The seeds are toxic only if eaten in large quantities.

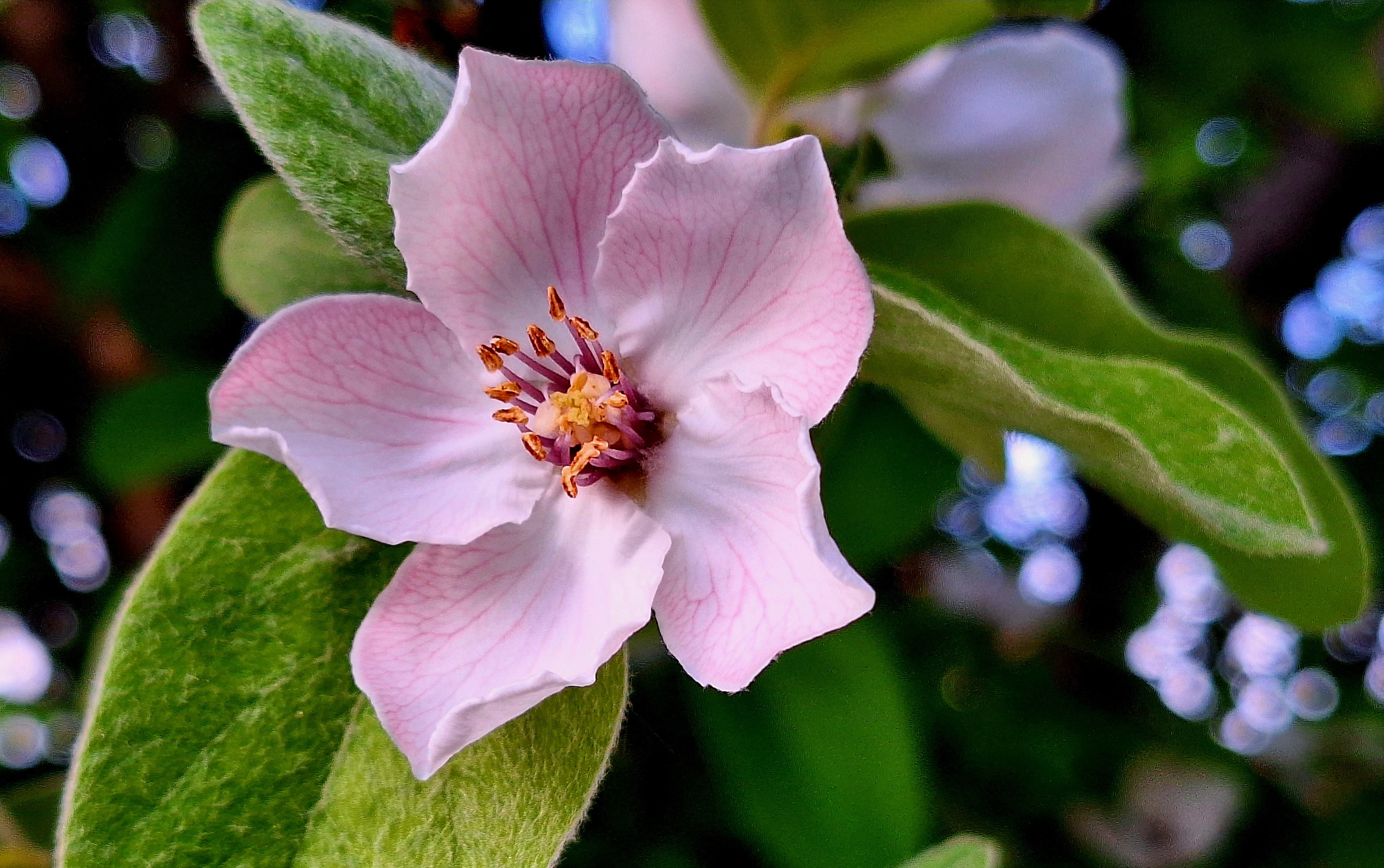
Flower

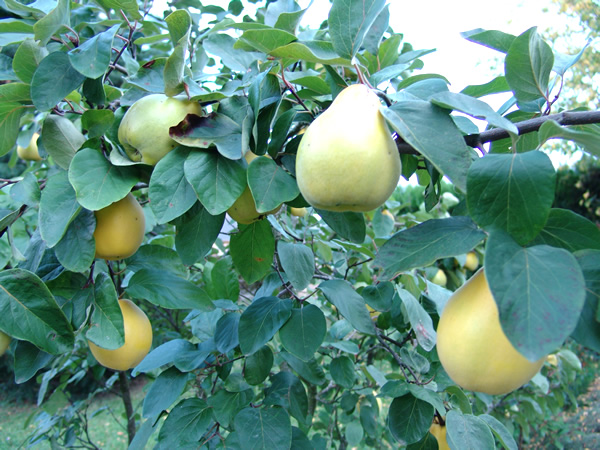
Foliage and ripening fruit

Cross section

== History ==
Quince is native to the Hyrcanian forests south of the Caspian Sea in Iran. From that centre of origin it was spread radially by Neolithic farmers, c. 5000 to 3000 BC, to secondary centres including Turkey, Azerbaijan, Turkmenistan, Kashmir, Afghanistan, and Syria. In turn, landraces of quince were then distributed across Europe, Russia, China, India, and North Africa. Charlemagne directed that quinces be planted in well-stocked orchards. Quinces in England are first recorded in about 1275, when Edward I had some planted at the Tower of London. The fruit had acquired its English name by the 14th century. Settlers brought it to North America in the 17th century, and to Central and South America in the 18th century. In the 18th-century New England colonies, there was always a quince at the lower corner of the vegetable garden, Ann Leighton notes in records of Portsmouth, New Hampshire and Newburyport, Massachusetts.

The fruit was known in the Akkadian language as supurgillu; "quinces" (collective plural), which was borrowed into Aramaic as ספרגלין sparglin; it was known in Judea during the Mishnaic Hebrew as פרישין prishin (a loanword from Jewish Palestinian Aramaic פרישין "the miraculous [fruit]"); quince flourished in the heat of the Mesopotamian plain, where apples did not. It was cultivated from an archaic period around the Mediterranean. Some ancients called the fruit "golden apples".

The Greeks associated it with Kydonia on Crete, as the "Cydonian pome", and Theophrastus, in his Enquiry into Plants, noted that quince was one of many fruiting plants that do not come true from seed.

As a sacred emblem of Aphrodite, a quince figured in a lost poem of Callimachus that survives in a prose epitome: seeing his beloved in the courtyard of the temple of Aphrodite, Acontius plucks a quince from the "orchard of Aphrodite", inscribes its skin and furtively rolls it at the feet of her illiterate nurse, whose curiosity aroused, hands it to the girl to read aloud, and the girl finds herself saying "I swear by Aphrodite that I will marry Acontius". A vow thus spoken in the goddess's temenos cannot be broken. Pliny the Elder mentions "numerous varieties" of quince in his Natural History and describes four.

Quinces are ripe on the tree only briefly: the Roman cookbook De re coquinaria of Apicius specifies in attempting to keep quinces, to select perfect unbruised fruits and keep stems and leaves intact, submerged in honey and reduced wine.

== Taxonomy ==
Cydonia is in the subfamily Amygdaloideae. The modern English name originated in the 14th century as a plural, understood as a singular noun, of quoyn, via Old French cooin, from Latin cotoneum malum / cydonium malum, ultimately from Greek κυδώνιον μῆλον, kydonion mēlon "Kydonian apple".

== Cultivation ==
Quince is a hardy, drought-tolerant shrub which adapts to many soils of low to medium pH. It tolerates both shade and sun, but sunlight is required to produce larger flowers and ensure fruit ripening. It is a hardy plant that does not require much maintenance, and tolerates years without pruning or major insect and disease problems.

Quince is cultivated on all continents in warm-temperate and temperate climates. It requires a cooler period of the year, with temperatures under 7 °C (45 °F), to flower properly. Propagation is done by cuttings or layering; the former method produces better plants, but they take longer to mature than by the latter. Named cultivars are propagated by cuttings or layers grafted on quince rootstock. Propagation by seed is not used commercially. Quince forms thick bushes, which must be pruned and reduced into a single stem to grow fruit-bearing trees for commercial use. The tree is self-pollinated, but it produces better yields when cross-pollinated.

Fruits are typically left on the tree to ripen fully. In warmer climates, it may become soft to the point of being edible, but additional ripening may be required in cooler climates. They are harvested in late autumn, before first frosts. Quince is used as rootstock for certain pear cultivars. In Europe, quinces are grown in small amounts; typically one or two quince trees are grown in a mixed orchard with several apples and other fruit trees.

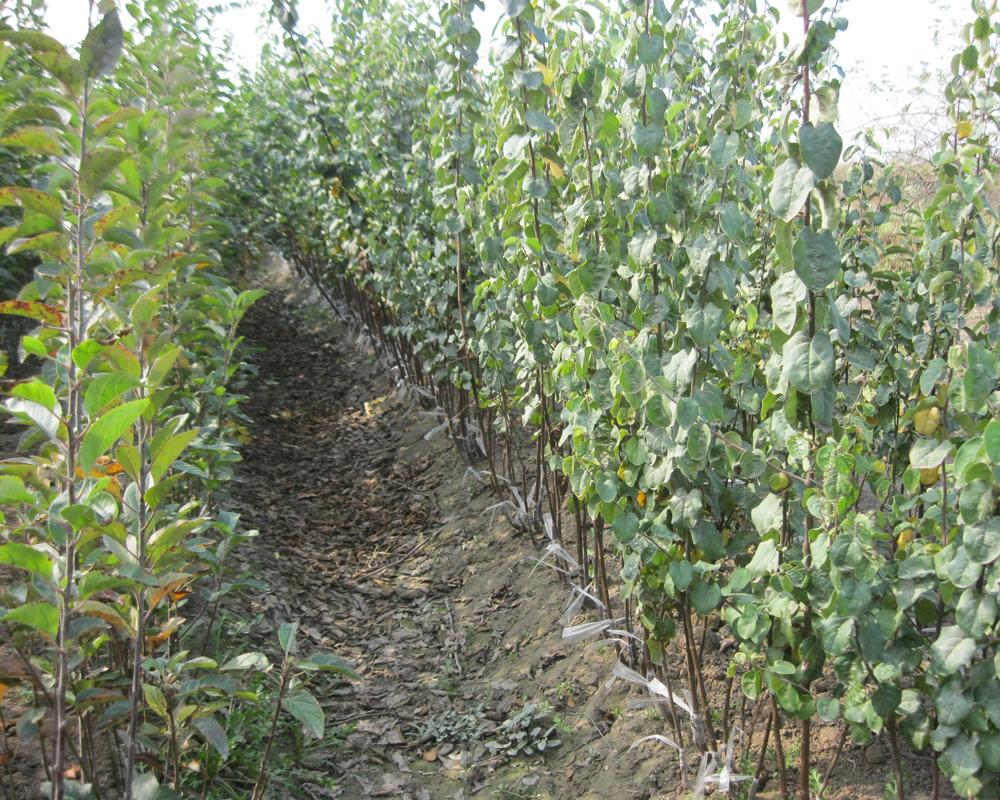
Quince nursery

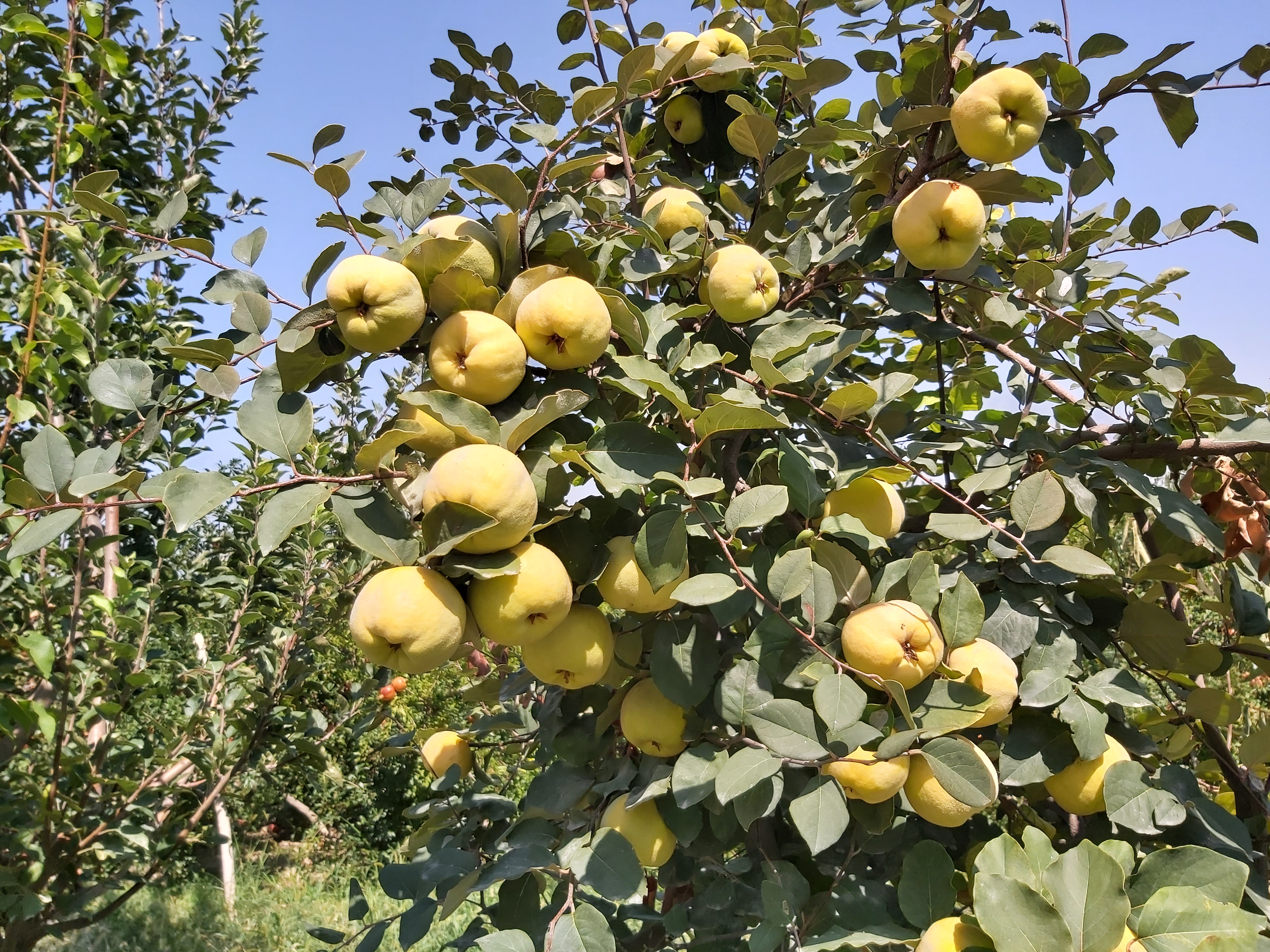
Fruits in tree

=== Pests and diseases ===
Quince is subject to a variety of pest insects including aphids, scale insects, mealybugs, and moth caterpillars such as leafrollers (Tortricidae) and codling moths.

While quince is a hardy shrub, it may develop fungal diseases in hot weather, resulting in premature leaf fall. Quince leaf blight, caused by fungus Diplocarpon mespili, presents a threat in wet summers, causing severe leaf spotting and early defoliation, affecting fruit to a lesser extent. Cedar-quince rust, caused by Gymnosporangium clavipes, requires two hosts to complete its life cycle, one usually a juniper, and the other a member of the Rosaceae. Appearing as red excrescence on various parts of the plant, it may affect quinces grown near junipers.

== Production ==
Quince production 2023, tonnes
Turkey	192,237
China	111,576
Uzbekistan	95,654
Iran	90,477
Morocco	43,523
World	687,036
Source: UN FAOSTAT

In 2023, world production of quinces was 687,036 tonnes, with Turkey and China accounting for 44% of the total (table).

=== Cultivars ===
Quince cultivars include:

- 'Champion'
- 'Cooke's Jumbo' (syn. 'Jumbo')
- 'Dwarf Orange'
- 'Gamboa'
- 'Le Bourgeaut'
- 'Lescovacz'
- 'Ludovic'
- 'Maliformis'
- 'Meeches Prolific'
- 'Morava'
- 'Orange' (syn. 'Apple quince')
- 'Perfume'
- 'Pineapple'
- 'Portugal' (syn. 'Lusitanica')
- 'Siebosa'
- 'Smyrna'
- 'Van Deman'
- 'Vranja' (syn. 'Bereczki')

The cultivars 'Vranja' Nenadovic and 'Serbian Gold' have gained the Royal Horticultural Society's Award of Garden Merit.

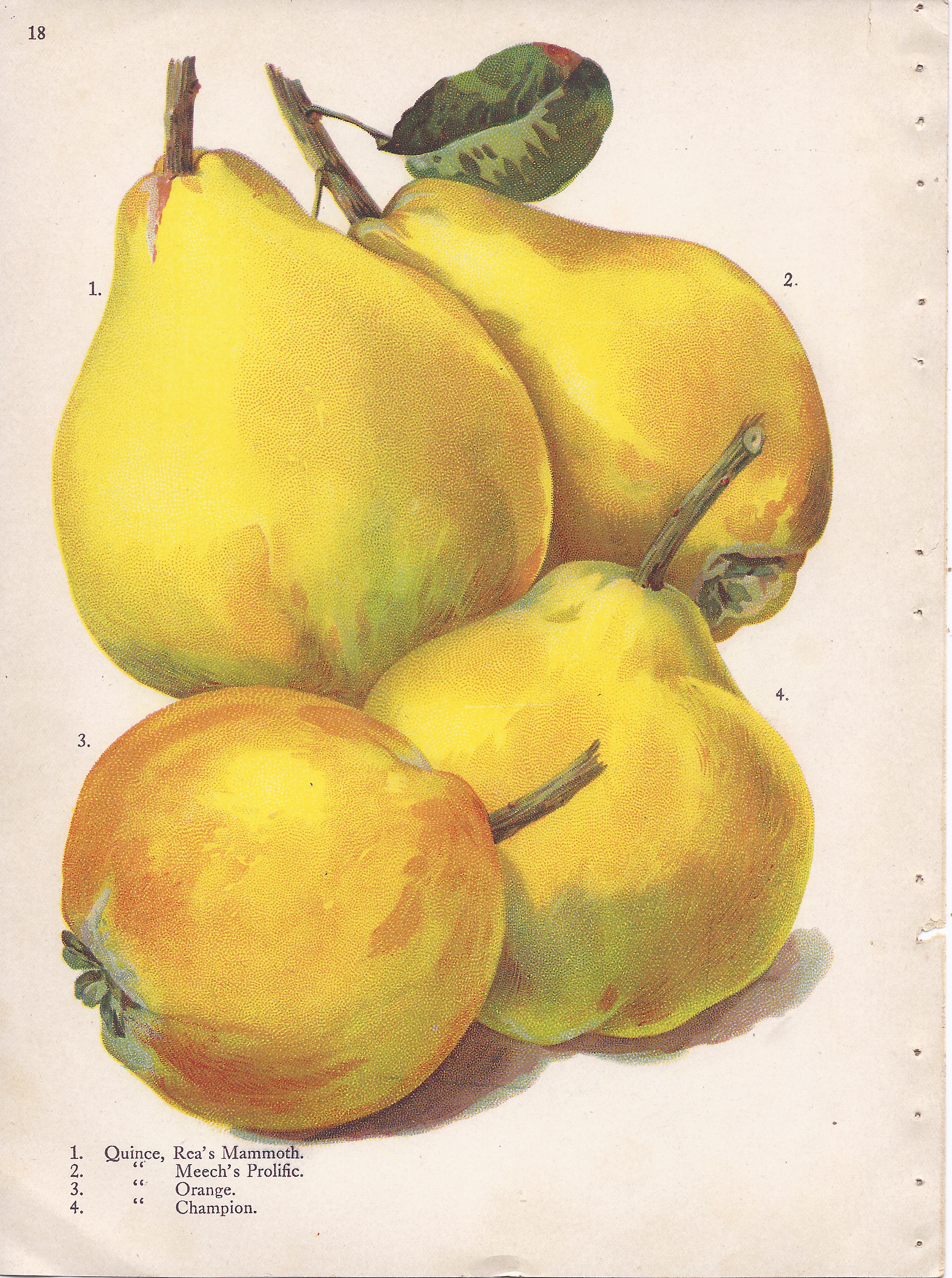
1 'Rea Mammoth', 2 'Meech's Prolific', 3 'Orange', and 4 'Champion' cultivars. 1909 illustration.

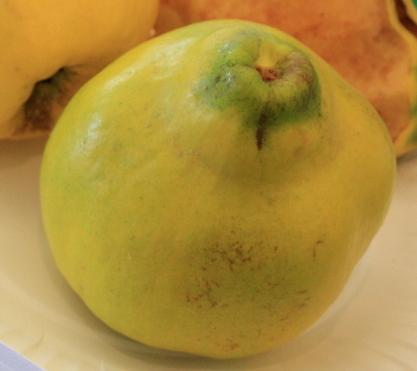
'Bourgeat' cultivar

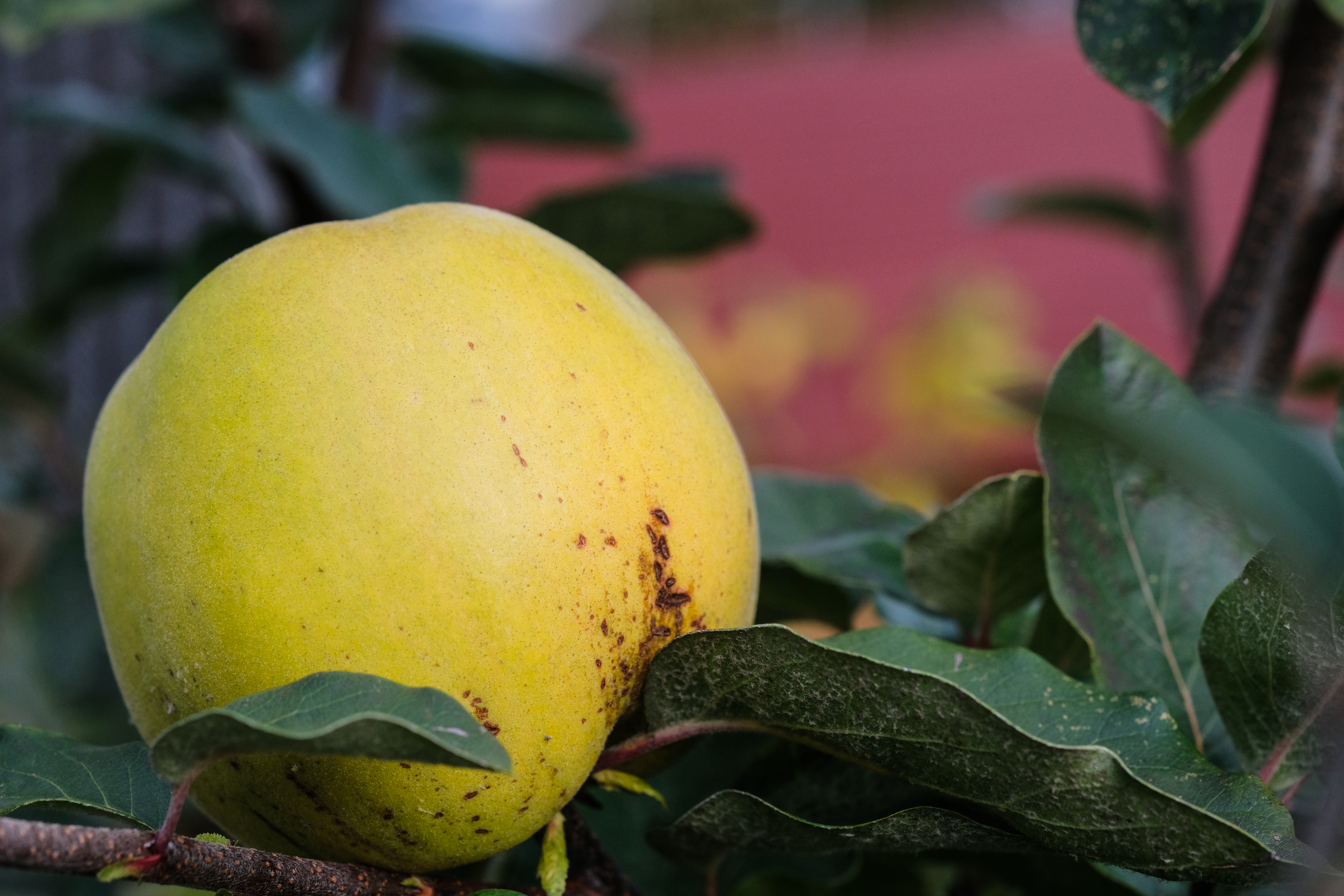
'Constantinople apple' cultivar

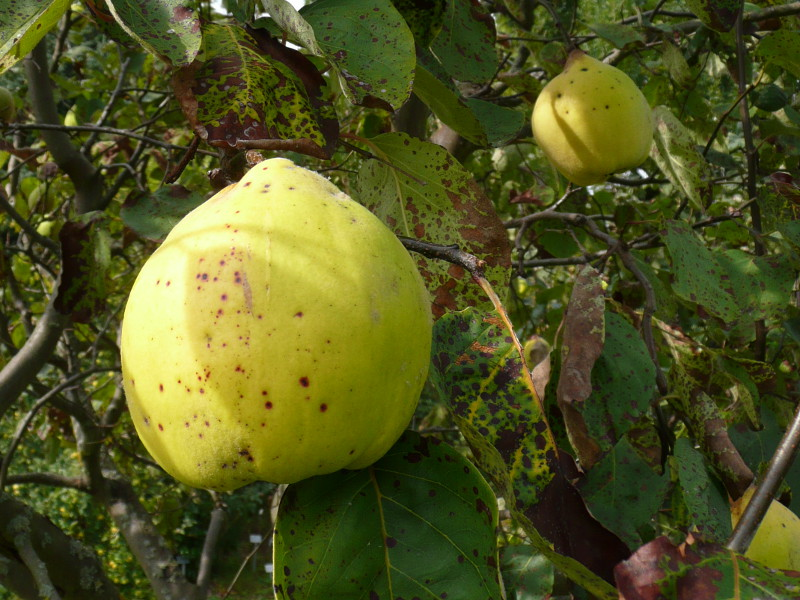
'Vranja' cultivar

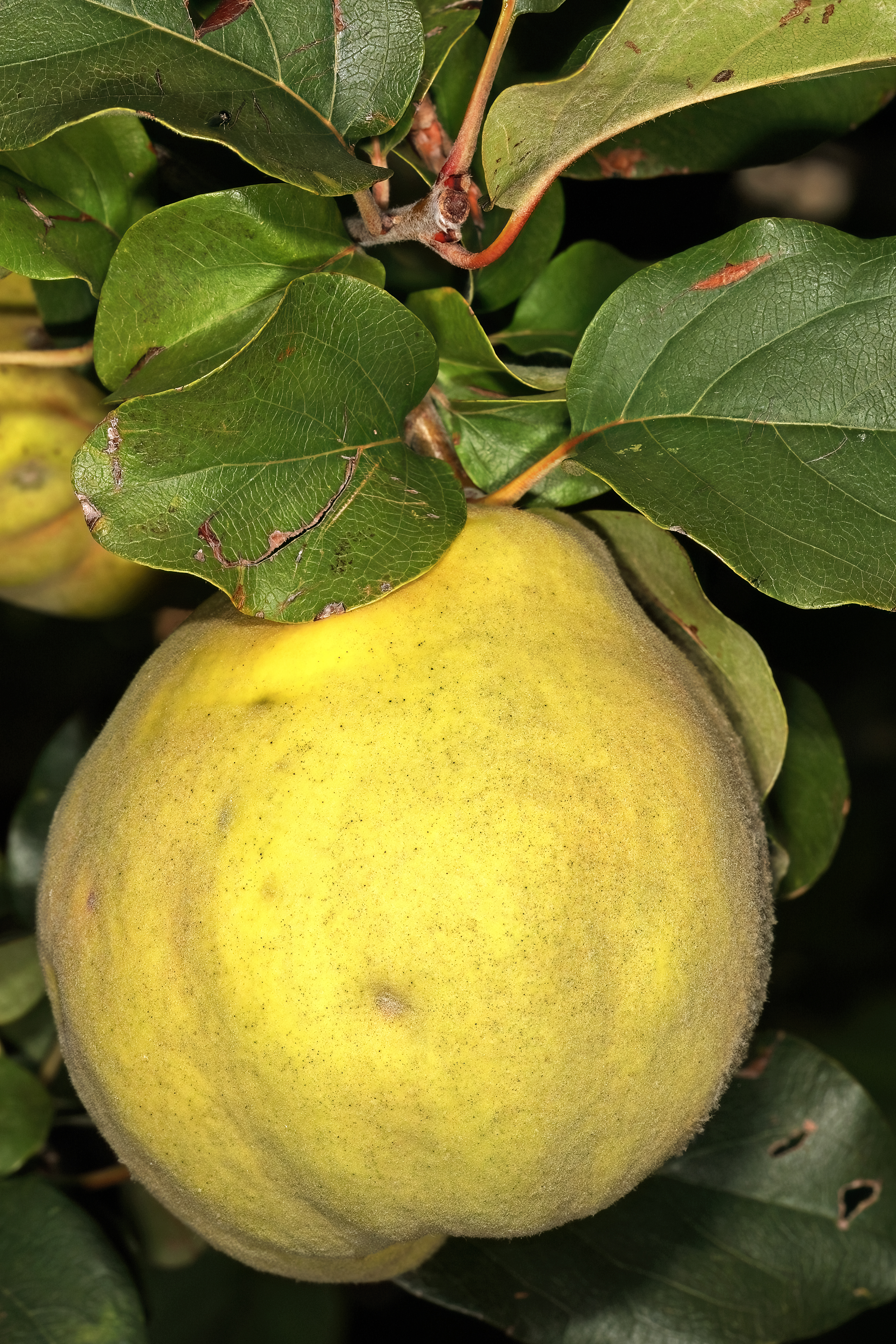
'Portugal' cultivar

== Uses ==
=== Nutrition ===
Quinces, raw
Nutritional value per 100 g (3.5 oz)
- Energy: 238 kJ (57 kcal)
- Carbohydrates: 15.3 g
- Dietary fibre: 1.9 g
- Fat: 0.1 g
- Protein: 0.4 g
Vitamins and minerals
Vitamins	Quantity %DV^{†}
Thiamine (B1)	2% 0.02 mg
Riboflavin (B2)	2% 0.03 mg
Niacin (B3)	1% 0.2 mg
Pantothenic acid (B5)	2% 0.081 mg
Vitamin B6	2% 0.04 mg
Folate (B9)	1% 3 μg
Vitamin C	17% 15 mg
Minerals	Quantity %DV^{†}
Calcium	1% 11 mg
Iron	4% 0.7 mg
Magnesium	2% 8 mg
Phosphorus	1% 17 mg
Potassium	7% 197 mg
Sodium	0% 4 mg
Zinc	0% 0.04 mg
- Other constituents: Quantity
- Water: 84 g
- Full Link to USDA FoodData Central Database entry
- ^{†}Percentages estimated using US recommendations for adults, except for potassium, which is estimated based on expert recommendation from the National Academies.

A raw quince is 84% water, 15% carbohydrates, and contains negligible fat and protein (table). In a 100-gram (3 1/2-ounce) reference amount, the fruit provides 238 kilojoules (57 kilocalories) of food energy and a moderate amount of vitamin C (17% of the Daily Value), with no other micronutrients in significant percentage of the Daily Value (table).

=== Culinary use ===
Quinces have intense aroma, flavour, and tartness; most varieties are too hard and tart to be eaten raw. They may be cooked or roasted and used for jams, marmalade, jellies, or pudding. A few varieties, such as 'Aromatnaya' and 'Kuganskaya', can be eaten raw. High in pectin, they are used to make jam, jelly and quince pudding, or they may be peeled, then roasted, baked or stewed; pectin levels diminish as the fruit ripens. Long cooking with sugar turns the flesh of the fruit red due to the presence of pigmented anthocyanins.

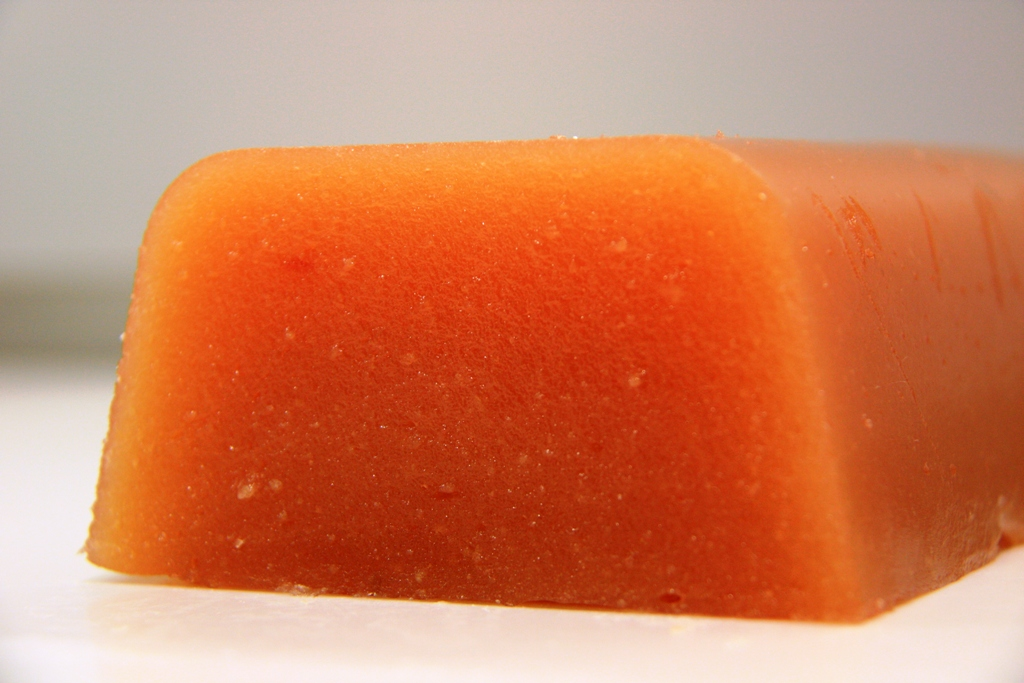
Quince cheese

The strong flavour means they can be added in small quantities to apple pies and jam. Adding a diced quince to apple sauce enhances the taste of the apple sauce.

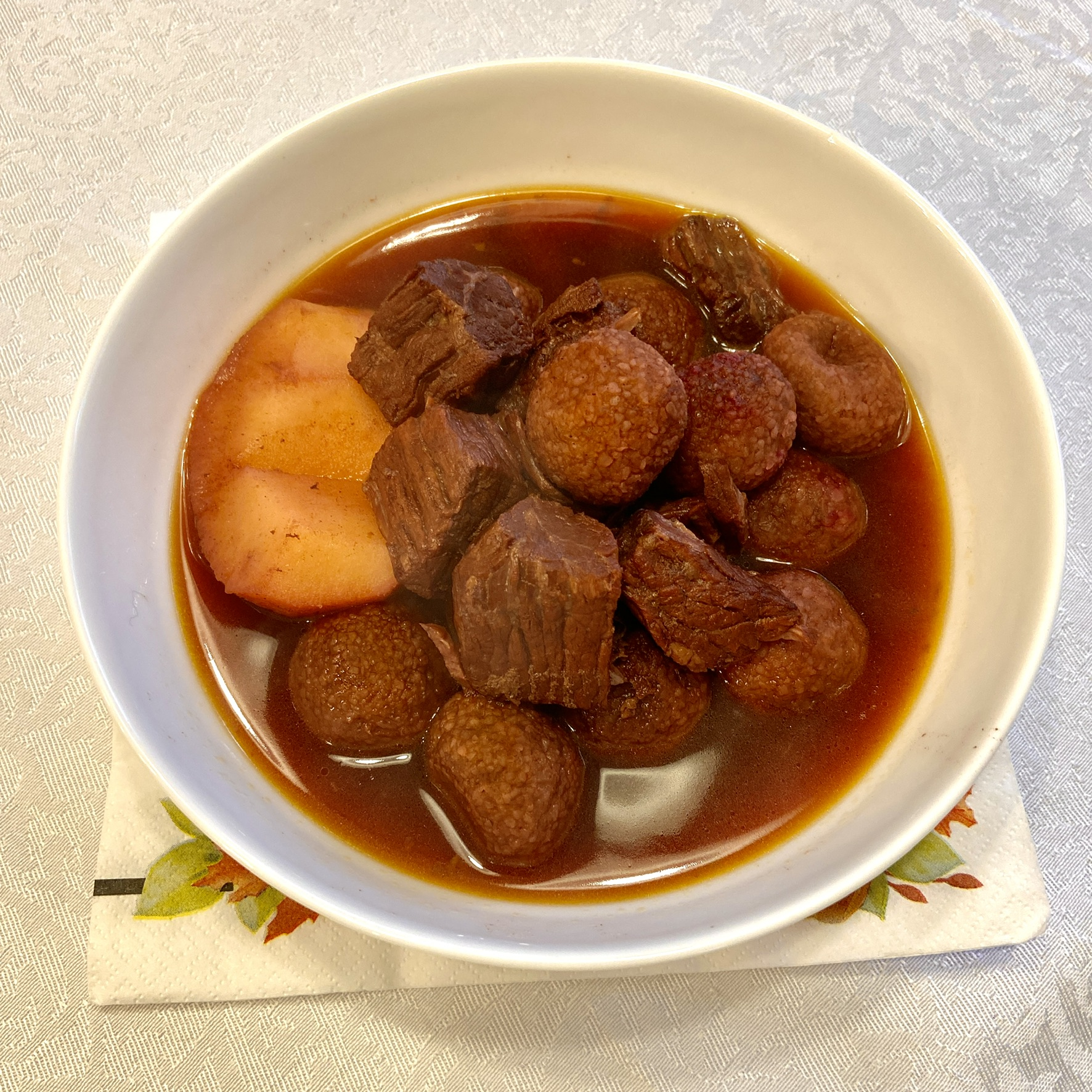
Levantine kibbeh safarjaliyeh, beef stew in quince sauce

Quince cheese or quince jelly originated from the Iberian Peninsula and is a firm, sticky, sweet reddish hard paste made by slowly cooking down the quince fruit with sugar. It is called dulce de membrillo in the Spanish-speaking world, where it is eaten with manchego cheese. Its Portuguese name, "marmelada" (from "marmelo" = "quince", +"ada" analogously as in "lemonade"), entered the international lexicon to attain a more general meaning.

Quince is used in the Levant, especially in Syria. It is added to either chicken or kibbeh to create an intense and unique taste such as with kibbeh safarjaliyeh.

=== Alcoholic drink ===
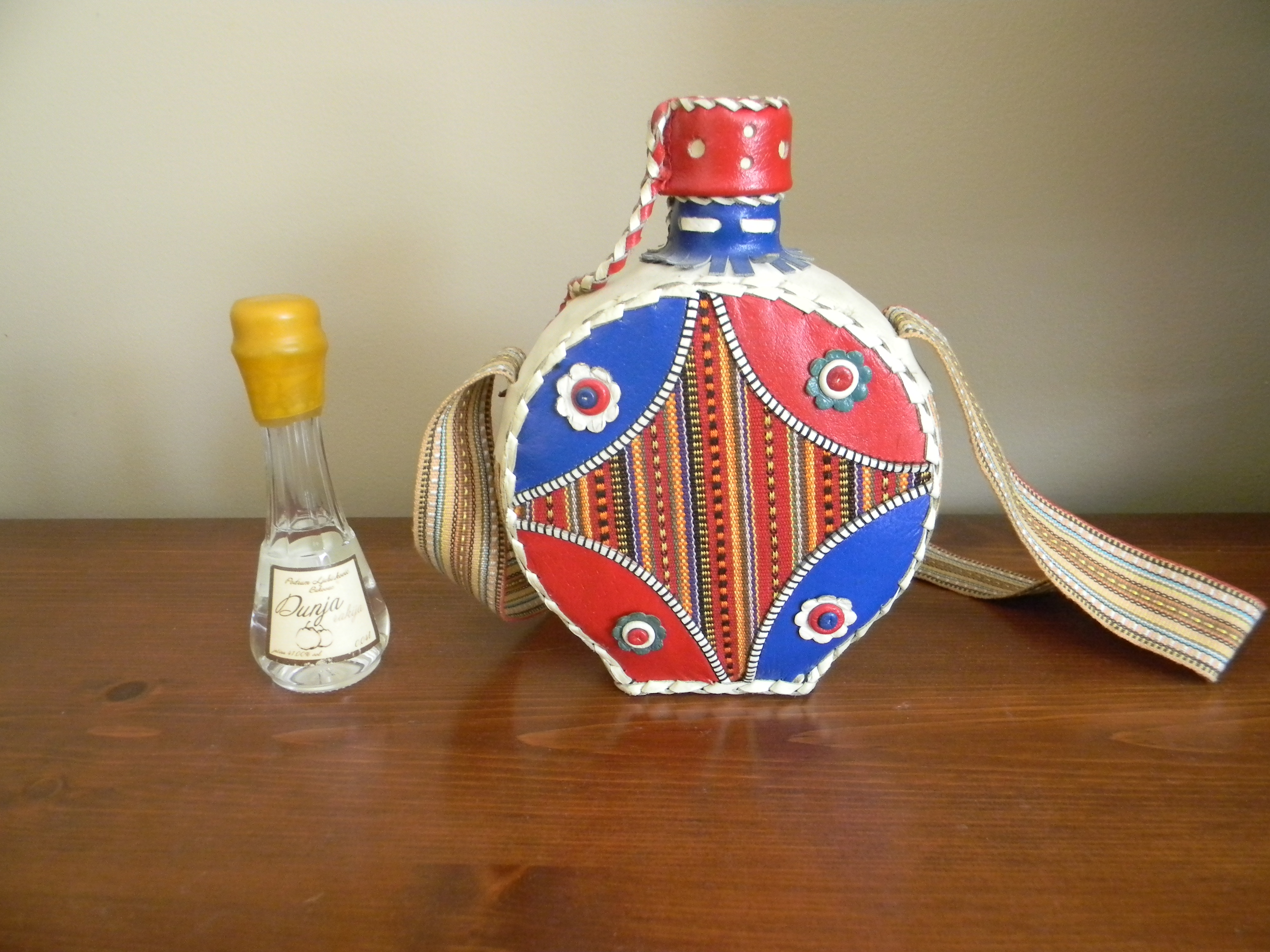
Quince rakija, Serbia

In the Balkans, quince eau-de-vie (rakija) is made. Ripe fruits of sweeter varieties are washed and cleared of rot and seeds, then crushed or minced, mixed with cold or boiling sweetened water and yeast, and left for several weeks to ferment. The fermented mash is distilled once, obtaining a 20–30 ABV, or twice, producing an approximately 60% ABV liquor. The two distillates may be mixed or diluted with distilled water to obtain the final product, containing 42–43% ABV.

In Carolina in 1709, the explorer and naturalist John Lawson wrote that he was "not a fair judge of the different sorts of Quinces which they call Brunswick, Portugal and Barbary", but "of this fruit they make a wine or liquor which they call Quince-Drink and which I approve of beyond any drink that their country affords ... The Quince-Drink most commonly purges".

== Cultural associations ==
In Plutarch's Lives, Solon is said to have decreed that "bride and bridegroom shall be shut into a chamber, and eat a quince together." The hero Hercules is associated with golden apples; these are thought by some scholars probably to have been quinces. When a baby is born in the Balkans, a quince tree is planted as a symbol of fertility, love and life. Edward Lear's 1870 nonsense poem The Owl and the Pussycat contains the lines

They dined on mince, and slices of quince
Which they ate with a runcible spoon;
And hand in hand, on the edge of the sand,
They danced by the light of the moon.

Kate Young writes in The Guardian that the poem may be nonsense, but that slices of quince work well with a meringue and whipped cream dessert.

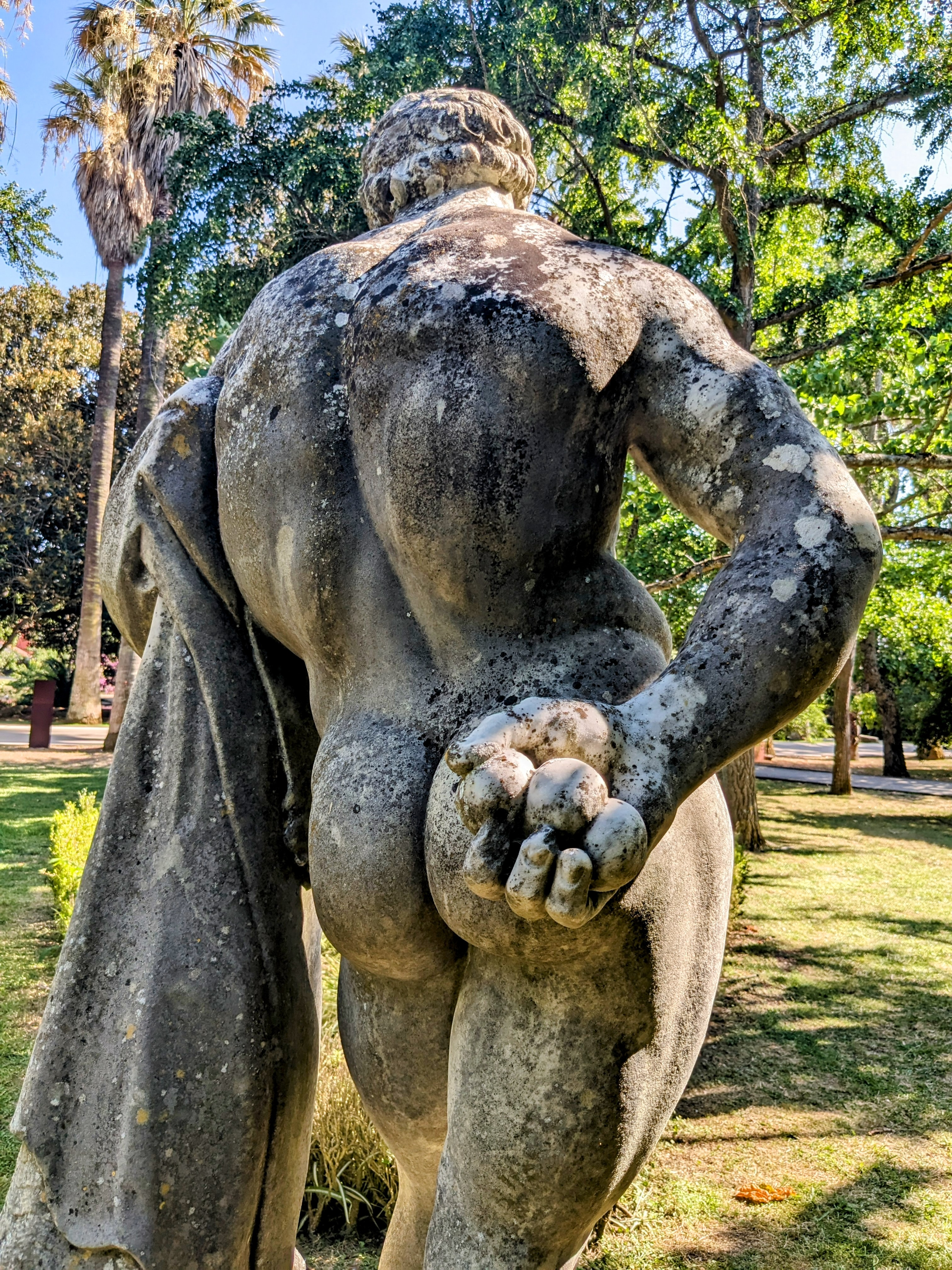
Farnese Hercules holding 3 'golden apples' or quinces. Copy of 3rd century AD statue

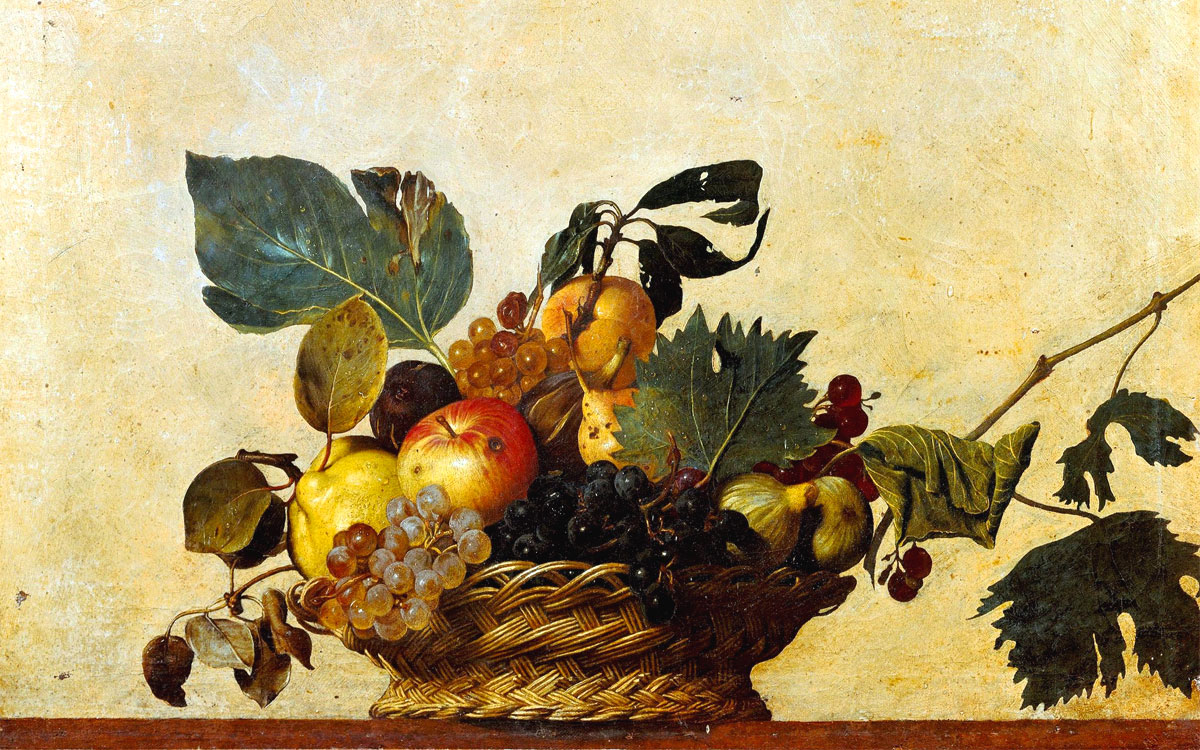
Quince in a fruit basket
Caravaggio, 1597–1600

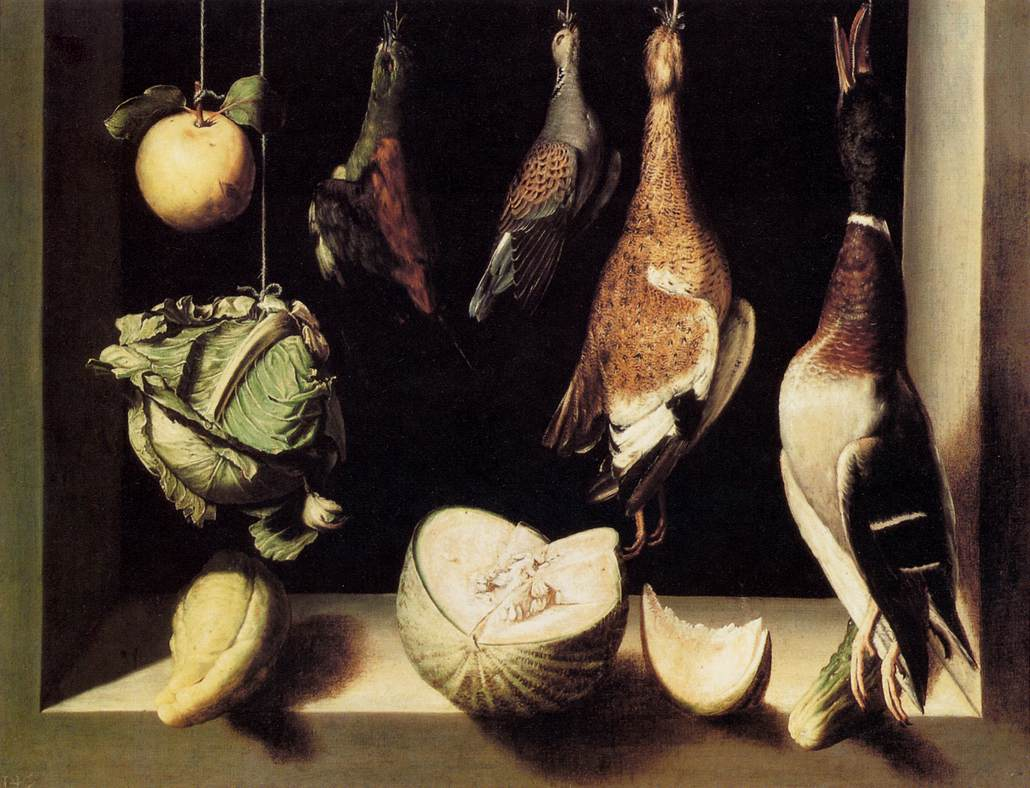
Quince in a still life
Juan Sánchez Cotán, 1600–1603

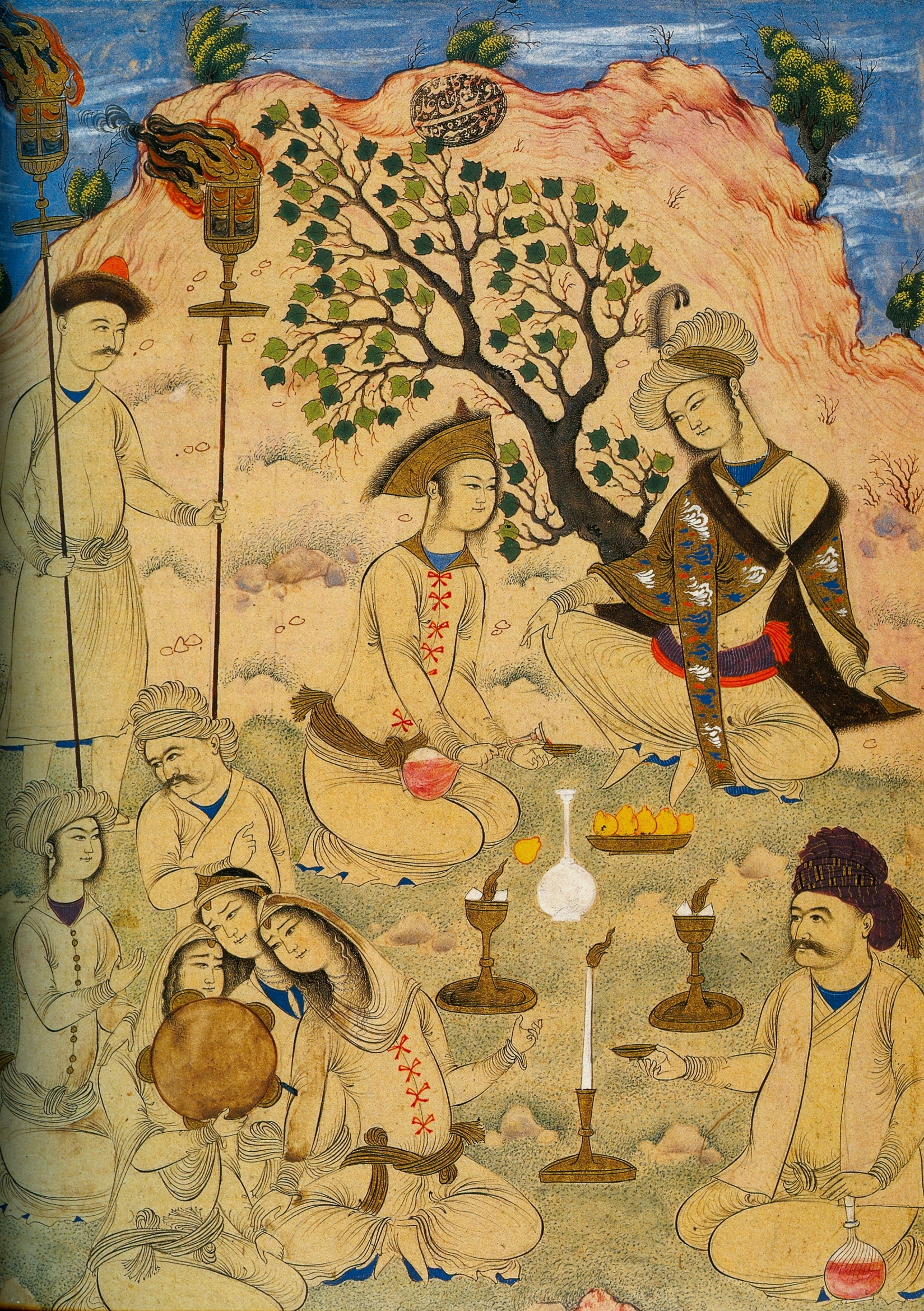
"A prince being entertained in the countryside" (also called "Nighttime Picnic")
by Muhammad Qasim, miniature c. 1650

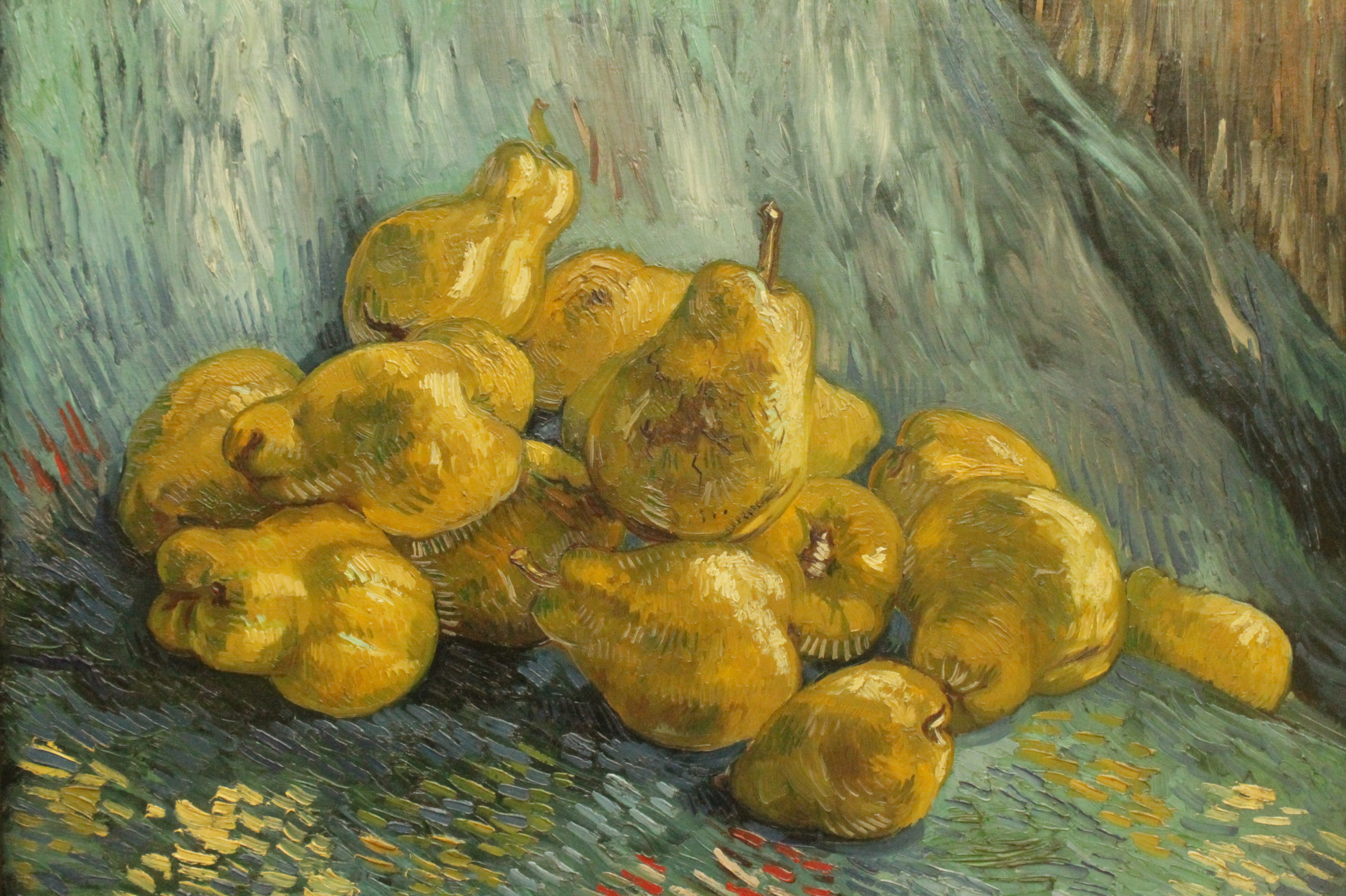
Still-life of quinces
Vincent van Gogh, 1887

== See also ==
- Chaenomeles, "flowering quince", are decorative plants related to quince, sometimes used as bonsai.
- List of culinary fruits
