= Uleodothis =

Scientific classification
- Kingdom: Fungi
- Division: Ascomycota
- Class: Dothideomycetes
- Order: Pleosporales
- Family: Venturiaceae
- Genus: Uleodothis; Theiss. & Syd.

Type species
- Uleodothis balansiana (Sacc., Roum. & Berl.) Theiss. & Syd.

Genus of fungi

Uleodothis is a genus of fungi in the family Venturiaceae.

The genus was circumscribed by Ferdinand Theissen and Hans Sydow in Ann. Mycol. vol.13 on page 305 in 1915.

The genus name of Uleodothis is in honour of Ernst Heinrich Georg Ule (1854–1915), who was a German botanist and plant collector.

== Species ==
As accepted by Species Fungorum;

- Uleodothis balansiana (Sacc., Roum. & Berl.) Theiss. & Syd. (1915)
- Uleodothis coonoorensis T.S. Ramakr. & K. Ramakr. (1950)
- Uleodothis eupatoriicola Garcés (1941)
- Uleodothis indica Tilak & S.B. Kale (1968)
- Uleodothis munkii (Speg.) Syd. & P. Syd. (1921)
- Uleodothis paspali F. Stevens (1924)
- Uleodothis pteridis F. Stevens (1920)
- Uleodothis rhynchosporae (Rehm) Theiss. & Syd. (1915)

Former species;

- U. andina Chardón (1930) = Achorella andina, Dothideomycetes family
- U. aphanes (Rehm) Theiss. & Syd. (1915) = Tomasellia aphanes, Naetrocymbaceae family
- U. tamarindi Bat. & A.F. Vital (1955) = Stigmochora controversa, Phyllachoraceae family
