= Peach scab =

Fungal disease of stone fruits

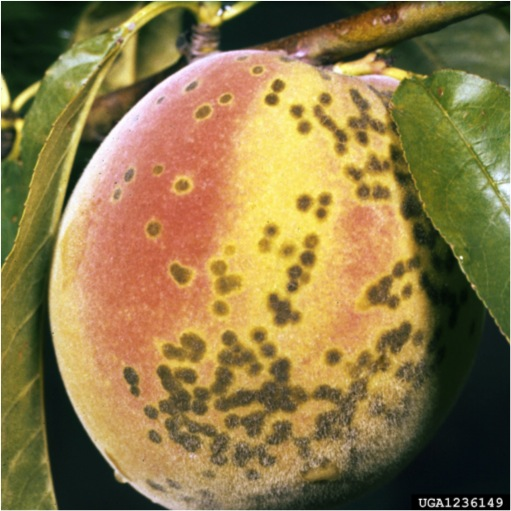
- Blackened Cladosporium carpophilum lesions formed on peach fruit
- Causal agents: Cladosporium carpophilum

Peach scab, also known as peach freckles, is a disease of stone fruits caused by the fungus Cladosporium carpophilum. The disease is most prevalent in wet and warm areas especially southern part of the U.S. as the fungi require rain and wind for dispersal. The fungus causes scabbing, lesions, and defoliating on twig, fruit, and leaf resulting in downgrade of peach quality or loss of fruits due to rotting in severe cases.

== Symptoms ==
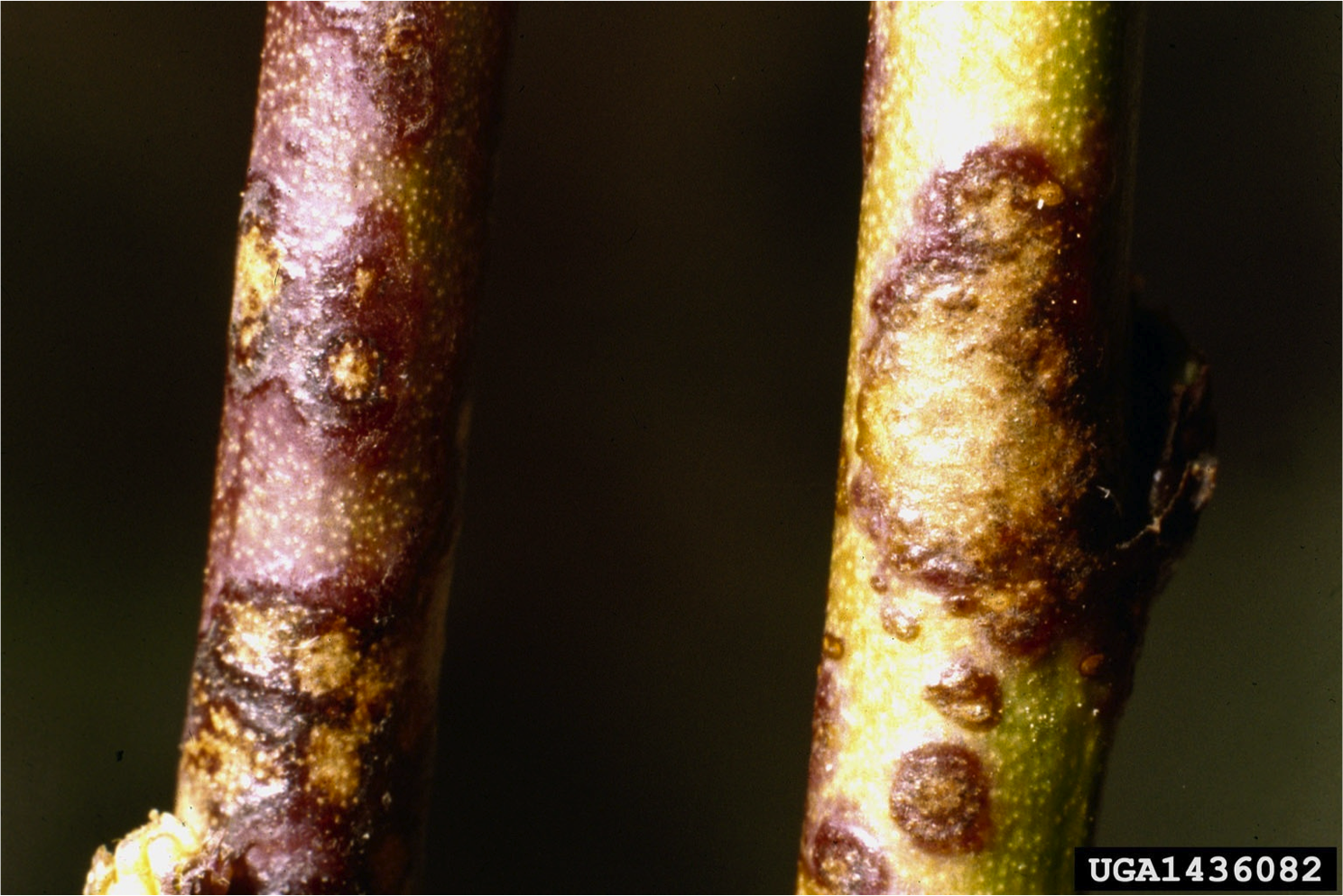
Cladosporium carpophilum lesions formed on peach twig

The disease affects most stone plants including peaches, apricots and plums. The symptoms can generally be found in three major parts of plant: fruits, twigs, and leaves. The symptoms on leaves and twigs are often considered as the least notable. Infected leaves initially show small and green colored lesions on under the leaves. They progress into yellowish brown and eventually appear as dark brown or black spots. Twig lesions start to form on green young stems. The lesions are about 3 up to 6.5 mm in diameter size. They usually first have reddish brown colors then which will turn into darker colors as they enlarge to an oval shape of 3 x 6mm approximately.

About six weeks after petals are fallen, the first and most notable and serious symptoms appear on fruits. Spots, which generally range from 1 to 2 mm in diameter size, are formed on the end of stem. They gradually change its color into dark green or black and grow about a few millimeters in diameter. As they enlarge, yellow circles will form around the velvety dark green spots. The spots have raised appearance on fruits instead of sunken figures which can be found most prevalently in other fungal infections. In some severe cases, fruits may be stunted or opened and exposed to further infection by airborne microorganisms.

== Disease cycle ==
As a part of asexual fungi group Fungi imperfecti, Cladosporium carpophilum does not produce sexual spores but produce conidia, mycelium, and chlamydospsores for its dispersal and survival structures. Conidia produced during spring and summer are the major source for primary inoculum. Another possible source for primary inoculum could be infected leaves fallen on the ground however the importance of this mechanism is unknown.

Conidia produced under the favorable conditions are spread from primary source by wind or rain to infect developing young susceptible twigs, fruits, or leaves of peach plant. Fruit infections take place during early development since conidia begin to produce and peak around calyx split and bloom. Once conidia are successfully landed on susceptible hosts, they form germ tubes which will become spore-bearing conidiophores. This step requires three sequential stages: sporophore production, spore production, and spore maturation. Infection is most severe during spring and winter because further spread of fungi is favored by wet and warm environment. The fungus overwinters as mycelium and chlamydospores in twig or leaf lesions and continues to produce asexual structures.

The fungus primarily infect young plants, therefore inoculum availability declines as fruits mature and the significance of infection during the maturation period is unknown. It takes an incubation period about 45 days and up to 77 days until primary symptoms appear on peach trees. Due to long the long incubation period, secondary cycle of fungus does not have significant effect on further infection. As noted earlier, epidemic development heavily depend on successful dispersal of conidia produced from primary inoculum.

== Environment ==
The primary cause of peach scab, Cladosporium carpophilum, can be found primarily in the Southern portion of the U.S. but still poses a threat in the Midwest. Peach scab affects stony fruits such as peaches, nectarines, and apricots. Like most fungal diseases, peach scab thrives in warm and moist conditions. As a fungus, adequate shade plays an important role in growth—particularly in areas lacking good sanitation. Poor pruning of branches/foliage can result in disease breakouts of peach scab. A combination of wet weather from late spring as well as poor sanitation can result in outbreaks later in the season. Peach scab grows optimally in wet conditions in temperature ranges of 22-30 degrees Celsius. Peach scab is easily controlled by dispersal and application of generic fungicides, so most occurrences appear in home orchards, and rarely does the disease pose a threat in commercial environments.

== Management ==
Due to the effectiveness of fungicide application and its relatively minor damage to crops, there are few cultural controls and no resistant peach variants that have been developed for the current market. For prevention of peach scab, proper pruning of leaves to allow adequate sunlight will drastically reduce the risk of infection and propagation. The primary form of regulation for peach scab requires frequent applications of commercial fungicides. There are three main types of fungicides that are effective against peach scab: captan, chlorothalonil, and demethylation inhibitors. Proper use of chlorothalonil requires application starting from shuck split and reapplication every two weeks. Increased temperature and wet weather will necessitate more frequent applications. Applications are necessary until 4–6 weeks until harvest.

== Importance ==
Due to widespread use of fungicides, Peach scab does not pose a large threat to commercial growers of stony fruits, and is primarily a disease that is found in home orchards. Proper sanitation and pruning of leaves will prevent a majority of infections from taking place. Historically, the disease is believed to have originated in Austria, but is now a minor presence for all peach trees typically east of the Rocky Mountains. As a minor disease, peach scab is most dangerous when the scabs develop—allowing brown rot to infect the plant, which is a far more devastating disease.
