= Sivanesaniella =

Scientific classification
- Kingdom: Fungi
- Division: Ascomycota
- Class: Dothideomycetes
- Order: Pleosporales
- Family: Venturiaceae
- Genus: Sivanesaniella; Gawande & Agarwal

Type species
- Sivanesaniella prunicola Gawande & Agarwal

Genus of fungi

Sivanesaniella is a genus of fungi in the family Venturiaceae. This is a monotypic genus, containing the single species Sivanesaniella prunicola.
