= Phragmogibbera =

Scientific classification
- Domain: Eukaryota
- Kingdom: Fungi
- Division: Ascomycota
- Class: Dothideomycetes
- Order: Pleosporales
- Family: Venturiaceae
- Genus: Phragmogibbera; Samuels & Rogerson

Type species
- Phragmogibbera xylariicola Samuels & Rogerson

Species
- P. herbicola P. xylariicola

Genus of fungi

Phragmogibbera is a genus of fungi in the family Venturiaceae.
