= Xenomeris =

Scientific classification
- Kingdom: Fungi
- Division: Ascomycota
- Class: Dothideomycetes
- Order: Pleosporales
- Family: Venturiaceae
- Genus: Xenomeris; Syd.

Type species
- Xenomeris pruni Std.

Genus of fungi

Xenomeris is a genus of fungi in the family Venturiaceae.

== Species ==
- X. abietis
- X. acicola
- X. alpina
- X. arbuti
- X. eucalypti
- X. hemisphaerica
- X. juniperi
- X. nicholsonii
- X. pruni
- X. raetica
- X. saccifolii
