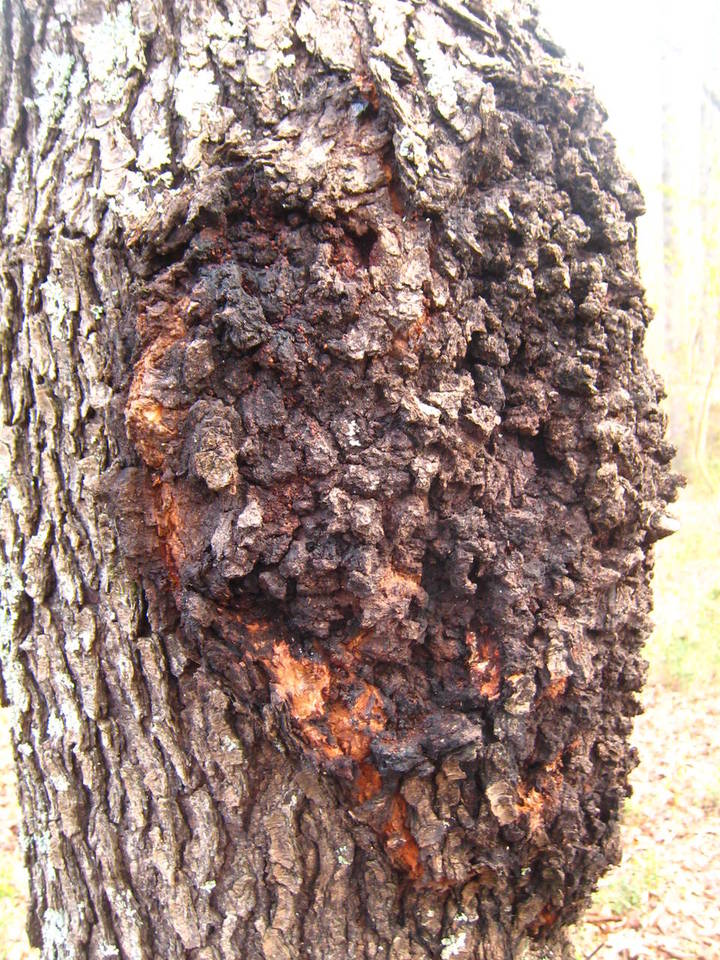
- Apiosporina morbosa on a tree bark

Scientific classification
- Kingdom: Fungi
- Division: Ascomycota
- Class: Dothideomycetes
- Order: Pleosporales
- Family: Venturiaceae
- Genus: Apiosporina; Höhn.

Type species
- Apiosporina collinsii (Schwein.) Höhn.

Species
- A. collinsii A. oronata A. fallax A. harunganae A. morbosa

= Apiosporina =

Genus of fungi

Apiosporina is a genus of fungi in the family Venturiaceae. Seeds of the Chinese elm, Trident maple and Japanese black pine can be infected with Apiosporina collinsii to produce dwarf forms used to make bonsai trees.
