= Trichodothis =

Scientific classification
- Kingdom: Fungi
- Division: Ascomycota
- Class: Dothideomycetes
- Order: Pleosporales
- Family: Venturiaceae
- Genus: Trichodothis; Theiss. & Syd.

Type species
- Trichodothis comata (Berk. & Ravenel) Theiss. & Syd.

Species
- T. comata T. ocoteae T. trachylaena T. zernyi

Genus of fungi

Trichodothis is a genus of fungi in the family Venturiaceae.
