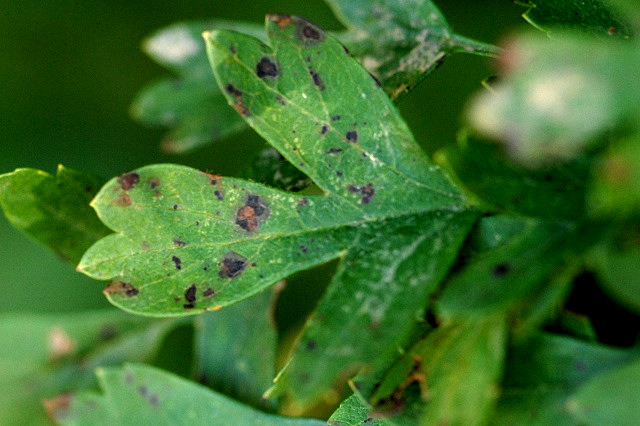

Scientific classification
- Kingdom: Fungi
- Division: Ascomycota
- Class: Leotiomycetes
- Order: Helotiales
- Family: Drepanopezizaceae
- Genus: Diplocarpon
- Species: D. mespili

Binomial name
- Diplocarpon mespili (Sorauer) B. Sutton (1980)

Synonyms
- Diplocarpon maculatum (G.F. Atk.) Jørst. (1945); Diplocarpon soraueri (Kleb.) Nannf. (1932); Entomopeziza mespili (DC.) Höhn. (1920); Entomopeziza soraueri Kleb. (1918); Entomosporium maculatum Lév. (1857); Entomosporium mespili (DC.) Sacc. (1880); Fabraea maculata (Lév.) G.F. Atk. (1951); Stigmatea mespili Sorauer (1878); Xyloma mespili DC. (1830)

= Diplocarpon mespili =

Species of fungus

Diplocarpon mespili is a pathogenic fungus which causes quince leaf blight, a leaf disease affecting chiefly common quince. It occurs in wet summers, causing severe leaf spotting and early defoliation, also affecting fruit to a lesser extent. It may also affect other Rosaceae such as hawthorn and medlar, but is typically less damaging than on quince.
