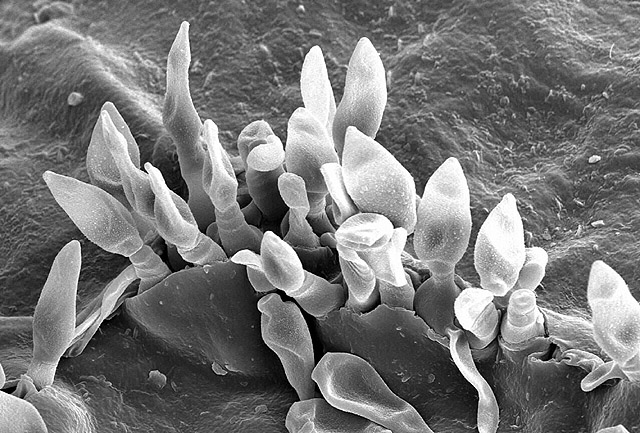
- The reproductive conidia of Venturia inaequalis erupting through the cuticle of a crabapple leaf

Scientific classification
- Kingdom: Fungi
- Division: Ascomycota
- Class: Dothideomycetes
- Order: Venturiales
- Family: Venturiaceae
- Genus: Venturia
- Species: V. inaequalis

Binomial name
- Venturia inaequalis (Cooke) G.Winter (1875)

Synonyms
- Sphaerella inaequalis Cooke (1866)

= Venturia inaequalis =

Species of fungus

Venturia inaequalis is an ascomycete fungus that causes the apple scab disease.

== Systematics ==
Venturia inaequalis anamorphs have been described under the names Fusicladium dendriticum and Spilocaea pomi. Whether V. inaequalis is a single species or contains several cryptic species has been a matter of debate for a long time. Recent genetic studies have revealed a considerable uniformity of the species. In addition, the fungus Spilocaea pyracanthae, a parasite of Pyracantha appeared not to genetically differ from V. inaequalis, being thus a special form of the latter.

== Morphology ==
The fruiting bodies, ascocarps appear in the form of pseudothecia. They are solitary and embedded into the host plant tissue. A pseudothecium has small dark hairs around its opening, and contains pseudoparaphyses along with asci. The asci contain eight haploid ascospores. The haploid chromosome number of V. inaequalis is seven.

== Life cycle ==
The infection cycle begins in the springtime, when suitable temperatures and moisture promote the release of V. inaequalis ascospores.
These spores rise into the air and land on the surface of a susceptible tree, where they germinate and form a germ tube that can directly penetrate the plant's waxy cuticle. A fungal mycelium forms between the cuticle and underlying epidermal tissue, developing asexually the conidia, that germinate on fresh areas of the host tree, which in turn produce another generation of conidial spores. This cycle of secondary infections continues throughout the summer, until the leaves and fruit fall from the tree at the onset of winter.
V. inaequalis overwinters mostly as immature perithecia, where sexual reproduction takes place, producing a new generation of ascospores that are released the following spring. Scab lesions located on the woody tissues may also overwinter in place, but will not undergo a sexual reproduction cycle; these lesions can still produce ineffective conidial spores in the spring.

== Effectors ==
Effectors are proteins encoded by pathogens, which act to effect a response from a host cell – often modulating the host immune response. Where a host variety is able to recognise and mount a resistance response to the presence of an effector, the effector is referred to as an Avirulence protein.

Presently, only one effector gene, AvrVg, eliciting a resistance response in Apple has been identified in V. inaequalis.

== Hosts and symptoms ==
The Venturia inaequalis pathogen is a fungal organism that produces similar symptoms across a range of woody hosts. These include the common pear (Pyrus spp.), firethorn (Pyracantha spp.), mountain ash (Sorbus spp.), and most notably both commercial apples along with ornamental crabapples (Malus spp.). Symptoms of the infection occur on leaves, fruit, flowers, and young green shoots. Foliar symptoms begin to occur in the early spring around budbreak and mainly present as light green lesions that progress to an olive-brown color with a velvety texture due to conidia formation as time passes. These large scab-like lesions can warp the leaf's shape and can eventually lead to defoliation. Lesions formed by primary infection via ascospores tend to have more distinct borders when compared to lesions as a result of a secondary infection cycle via conidia. Young fruit, often infected by foliar conidia, can also display similar symptoms to infected leaves. In this case the lesions progress to bare, brown and corky spots. The apple skin and flesh can split open as the fruit enlarges, though young fruits often prematurely drop. Mature fruits are more resistant to infection and only form small, black 'pin-head scabs' which might not even be noticeable until after storage.

== Importance ==
Economic losses due to apple scab over an extended period of time far outweigh the impact of any other apple pathogen. Historically one can find examples of the symptoms of V. inaequalis in paintings as far back as the fifteenth century. Fruit production can be limited due to defoliation while limiting fruit bud creation in the following year. While the disease can cause total crop loss in optimal conditions without management, the main economic impact is due to the reduction in both size and marketable quality of the fruit. This issue is further compounded by the fact that apple cultivars with a high market share, Pink Lady for example, are susceptible to the pathogen while more resistant varieties are less well known or desired by consumers. At an industrial production level these threats are only reliably mitigated by expensive, labor-intensive and repeated spraying of pesticides. In regions of apple production where the year's weather is conducive to infection up to 70% of the pesticides applied are used to control for the effects of apple scab. While the main host of economic interest are various apple cultivars the other host species are still affected by the pathogen. Considering most of these are commercially used as ornamental species, flowering crab apples for example, the importance of the pathogen shifts to be a more aesthetic nuisance. In the academic sense V. inaequalis has proved invaluable in the realm of genetic research of pathogenicity. It is one of the first ascomycete fungi to undergo genetic analysis and continues to be useful in that field. The fungi's mechanistic similarity to obligate parasites while still being able to be cultured in media has led to its repeated use in the study of the genes related to pathogenicity.

== Management ==
Protection from initial inoculation, either via sexual ascospores or asexual conidia, with fungicide is the main form of pathogen management. Spray schedules should be created with plant and pathogen development timings in mind and thus should begin with an initial spray at budswell and repeated in 10 to 14 day intervals. Specifics of the spray intervals should also be determined by considering what spray is used, weather patterns (mainly rain and moisture), host species, host growth patterns, and the amount of fungal inoculum present. Cultural practices can also be used to limit or prevent apple scab infection. Orchard design and planting patterns focusing on increased aeration are important in ensuring that susceptible tissues dry prior to initial infection. Proper pruning can further aid this effect. Another form of cultural management is the implementation of proper sanitation. Fallen infected leaves in the fall should be collected and destroyed to reduce the total inoculum able to overwinter and infect the following year. Primary infection is mainly caused by the ascospores that overwinter in the fallen debris and the density of these spores in the spring is directly related to the speed and intensity of an apple scab outbreak. In addition to direct removal of fallen infected tissues, mulching of fallen leaves into the soil to destroy the ascospores is advisable. Application of nitrogenous fertilizer to speed up this process can be done immediately prior to leaf fall or as a ground application. More proactive methods of management exist in the form of genetically resistant cultivars and species. Apple cultivars such as Enterprise, Goldrush, Liberty, Jonafree, Macfree, Prima, Pristine, Redfree, and Sir Prize are resistant to apple scab infection along with multiple varieties of ornamental crab apples. Breeding of resistant lines has seen minimal acceptance in the Americas but more widespread success in Europe, though the durability of this resistance is always a concern. More recently, biofungicidal methods of control have emerged in studies with some promise being shown by the organism Microsphaeropsis ochracea in reduction of initial ascospore inoculum of up to 70–80 percent. While still requiring a fungicide application, the use of the proposed mycoparasite allows for a delayed and lower volume use of chemicals.
