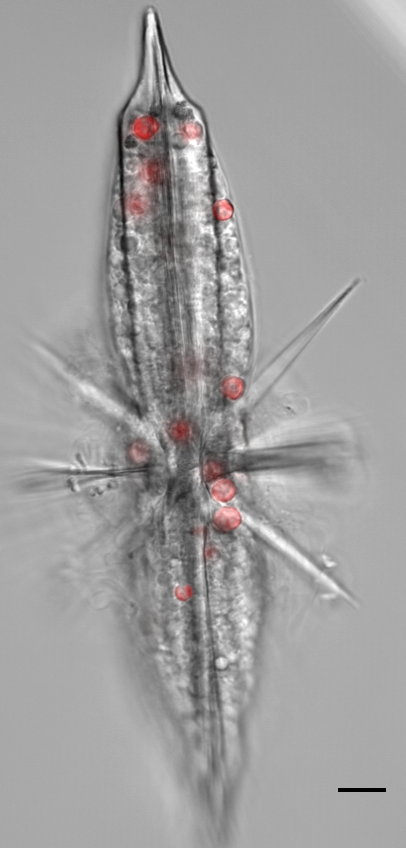
- Acantharian with Phaeocystis symbionts

Scientific classification
- Kingdom: Fungi
- Division: Ascomycota
- Class: Dothideomycetes
- Order: Pleosporales
- Family: Venturiaceae
- Genus: Acantharia; Theiss. & Syd.

Type species
- Acantharia echinata (Ellis & Everh.) Theiss. & Syd.

Species
- See text

= Acantharia (fungus) =

Genus of fungi

Acantharia is a genus of fungi in the Venturiaceae family.

== Species ==
- Acantharia aterrima (Cooke & G. Winter) Arx (1954)
- Acantharia chaetomoides W.H. Hsieh, Chi Y. Chen & Sivan. (1995)
- Acantharia echinata (Ellis & Everh.) Theiss. & Syd. (1918)
- Acantharia elegans (Syd. & P. Syd.) Arx (1954)
- Acantharia hamata (Penz. & Sacc.) Arx (1954)
- Acantharia quercus-dilatatae S.K. Bose & E. Müll. (1965)
- Acantharia sinensis (Petr.) Arx (1954)
