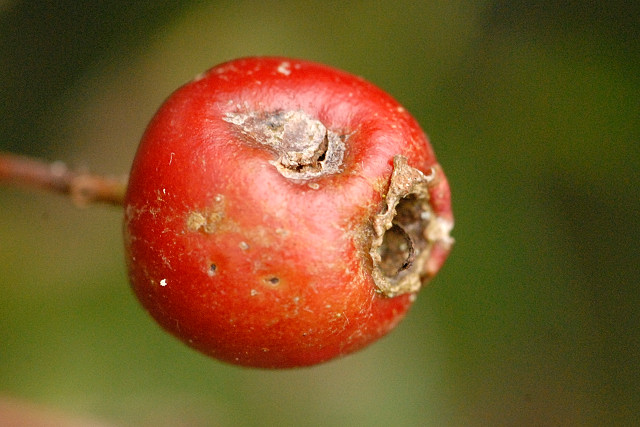
- Venturia inaequalis

Scientific classification
- Domain: Eukaryota
- Kingdom: Fungi
- Division: Ascomycota
- Class: Dothideomycetes
- Order: Venturiales; Y. Zhang ter, C. L. Schoch & K. D. Hyde, (2011)

Families
- Cylindrosympodiaceae; Sympoventuriaceae; Venturiaceae

= Venturiales =

Venturiales Temporal range: Eocene–recent

Order of fungi

The Venturiales is an order in the fungal class Dothideomycetes.

== Overview ==
Members of the order Venturiales are widely distributed. These include parasites and saprobes as well as pathogens of humans, animals, and plants. Members of the family Venturiaceae compose about 80% of all Venturiales.

== Life cycle ==
The asexual life cycle of Venturiales involves the penetration of the cuticle of the host species, and then expanding into the immediately subcuticular tissue before conidiation.
