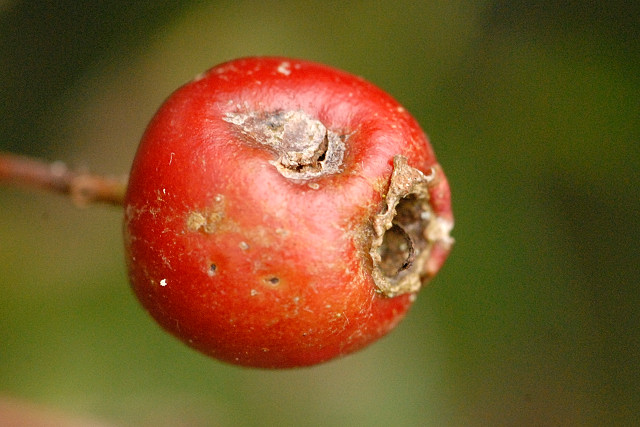
- Venturia inaequalis

Scientific classification
- Kingdom: Fungi
- Division: Ascomycota
- Class: Dothideomycetes
- Order: Venturiales
- Family: Venturiaceae; E.Müll. & Arx ex M.E.Barr

Type genus
- Venturia Sacc.

= Venturiaceae =

Family of fungi

The Venturiaceae are a family of fungi in the order Venturiales. Several of the species in this family are plant pathogens.

== List of genera ==
As accepted by GBIF;

- Acantharia Theissen & H.Sydow, 1918 (7)
- Antennaria Link (2)
- Antennularia Rchb. (1)
- Anungitea B.Sutton (30)
- Anungitopsis R.F.Castañeda Ruiz & W.B.Kendrick, 1990 (9)
- Aphysa (2)
- Apiosporina Höhn. (5)
- Arkoola J.Walker & G.E.Stovold, 1986 (1)
- Arnaudia (1)
- Asterula (3)
- Atopospora Petr. (4)
- Botryostroma F.von Höhnel, 1911 (3)
- Caproventuria U.Braun, 1998 (1)
- Coleroa Rabenh. (31)
- Crotone Theissen & Sydow, 1915 (2)
- Cylindrosympodioides (3)
- Cylindrosympodium W.B.Kendrick & R.F.Castañeda Ruiz, 1990 (18)
- Dictyodochium A.Sivanesan, 1984 (1)
- Ectosticta (9)
- Fusicladium Bonord. (112)
- Gelatosphaera (2)
- Gibbera Fr. (50)
- Karakulinia (1)
- Lasiobotrys Kunze (5)
- Limacinia (6)
- Lineostroma H.J.Swart, 1988 (1)
- Magnohelicospora R.F.Castañeda-Ruiz, M.Hernández-Restrepo, J.Gené & J.Guarro, 2013 (2)
- Maireella (1)
- Metacoleroa Petr. (1)
- Monopus (1)
- Montagnina (1)
- Napicladium Thüm. (14)
- Phaeosphaerella P.Karst. (31)
- Phaeosporella (1)
- Phragmogibbera G.J.Samuels & C.T.Rogerson, 1990 (2)
- Piggotia Berk. & Broome (4)
- Polyrhizon Theissen & H.Sydow, 1914 (7)
- Protoventuria Berl. & Sacc. (20)
- Pseudoanungitea P.Crous, 2018 (3)
- Pseudocladosporium U.Braun, 1998 (3)
- Pseudoparodiella F.L.Stevens, 1927 (1)
- Pseudotthia (1)
- Pyrenobotrys Theiss. & Syd. (2)
- Rhizogene H.Sydow & P.Sydow, 1921 (2)
- Rhizosphaera L.Mangin & Har. (13)
- Robledia (1)
- Rosenscheldiella Theissen & H.Sydow, 1915 (21)
- Sivanesaniella Gawande & Agarwal, 2004 (1)
- Spilocaea Fr., 1819 (2)
- Spilodochium Syd., 1927 (4)
- Spilosticta (8)
- Stigmatea Fries, 1849 (27)
- Trichodothella Petr. (2)
- Trichodothis Theissen & H.Sydow, 1914 (3)
- Tyrannosorus W.A.Untereiner & D.Malloch, 1995 (1)
- Uleodothis Theissen & H.Sydow, 1915 (8)
- Venturia Sacc., 1882 (206)
- Xenomeris Syd. (12)

Figures in brackets are approx. how many species per genus.
