= List of apple diseases =

Diseases of apples (Malus domestica) include:

== Bacterial diseases ==
Pseudomonadota
Blister spot	Pseudomonas syringae pv. papulans
Crown gall	Agrobacterium tumefaciens
Fire blight	Erwinia amylovora
Hairy root	Agrobacterium rhizogenes
Mycoplasmatota
Apple chat fruit	Phytoplasma suspected
Apple decline	Phytoplasma suspected
Apple proliferation	Phytoplasma
Rubbery wood	Phytoplasma suspected

== Fungal diseases ==
Fungal diseases
Alternaria blotch	Alternaria mali = A. alternata apple pathotype
Alternaria rot	Alternaria alternata
American brown rot	Monilinia fructicola
Anthracnose canker and bull's-eye rot	Pezicula malicorticus Cryptosporiopsis curvispora [anamorph]
Apple scab	Venturia inaequalis Spilocaea pomi [anamorph]
Apple ring rot and canker	Botryosphaeria berengeriana = Physalospora
Armillaria root rot = shoestring root rot	Armillaria mellea
Bitter rot	Glomerella cingulata [teleomorph] (archaic); Colletotrichum gloeosporioides [anamorph] Colletotrichum gloeosporioides species complex: Colletotrichum fructicola; Colletotrichum chrysophilum; Colletotrichum acutatum species complex: Colletotrichum fioriniae; Colletotrichum nymphaeae
Black pox	Helminthosporium papulosum
Black root rot	Xylaria mali Xylaria polymorpha
Black rot, frogeye leafspot and canker	Botryosphaeria obtusa Sphaeropsis malorum [anamorph]
Blister canker = nailhead canker	Biscogniauxia marginata = Nummularia discreta
Blue mold	Penicillium spp. Penicillium expansum
Brooks fruit spot	Mycosphaerella pomi Cylindrosporium pomi [anamorph]
Brown rot blossom blight and spur infection	Monilinia laxa
Calyx-end rot	Sclerotinia sclerotiorum
Clitocybe root rot	Armillaria tabescens = Clitocybe tabescens
Diaporthe canker*	Diaporthe tanakae Phomopsis tanakae [anamorph]
Diplodia canker	Botryosphaeria stevensii = Physalospora malorum Diplodia mutila [anamorph]
European brown rot	Monilinia fructigena Monilia fructigena [anamorph] Monilinia laxa
Fisheye rot	Butlerelfia eustacei = Corticium centrifugum
Flyspeck	Schizothyrium pomi Zygophiala jamaicensis [anamorph]
Fruit blotch, leaf spot and twig canker	Phyllosticta solitaria
Glomerella leaf spot	Glomerella cingulata Colletotrichum gloeosporioides [anamorph]
Gray mold rot = dry eye rot, blossom-end rot	Botrytis cinerea Botryotinia fuckeliana [teleomorph]
Leptosphaeria canker and fruit rot	Diapleella coniothyrium = Leptosphaeria coniothyrium Coniothyrium fuckelii [anamorph]
Leucostoma canker and dieback	Leucostoma cinctum Cytospora cincta [anamorph] Valsa auerswaldii = Leucostoma auerswaldii Cytospora personata [anamorph]
Marssonina blotch	Diplocarpon coronariae
Moldy core and core rot	Alternaria spp. Cladosporium spp. Coniothyrium sp. Epicoccum spp. Pleospora herbarum Stemphylium spp. Ulocladium spp.
Monilia leaf blight	Monilinia mali Monilia sp. [anamorph]
Monochaetia twig canker	Seiridium unicorne = Monochaetia mali Lepteutypa cupressi [teleomorph]
Mucor rot	Mucor spp. Mucor piriformis
Nectria canker	Nectria galligena Cylindrocarpon heteronemum [anamorph]
Nectria twig blight = coral spot	Nectria cinnabarina Tubercularia vulgaris [anamorph]
Peniophora root canker	Peniophora sacrata
Perennial canker	Neofabraea perennans Cryptosporiopsis perennans [anamorph]
Phomopsis canker, fruit decay and rough bark	Phomopsis mali Diaporthe perniciosa [teleomorph]
Phymatotrichum root rot = cotton root rot	Phymatotrichopsis omnivora = Phymatotrichum omnivorum
Phytophthora crown, collar and root rot = sprinkler rot	Phytophthora spp. Phytophthora cactorum Phytophthora cambivora Phytophthora cryptogea Phytophthora megasperma Phytophthora syringae
Phytophthora fruit rot	Phytophthora cactorum Phytophthora syringae
Pink mold rot	Trichothecium roseum = Cephalothecium roseum
Powdery mildew	Podosphaera leucotricha
Rosellinia root rot = Dematophora root rot	Rosellinia necatrix Dematophora necatrix [anamorph]
Rubber rot	Phacidiopycnis washingtonensis
Rusts
American hawthorne rust	Gymnosporangium globosum
Cedar apple rust	Gymnosporangium juniperi-virginianae
Japanese apple rust	Gymnosporangium yamadae
Pacific Coast pear rust	Gymnosporangium libocedri
Quince rust	Gymnosporangium clavipes
...
Side rot	Phialophora malorum
Silver leaf	Chondrostereum purpureum
Sooty blotch complex	Peltaster fructicola Geastrumia polystigmatis Leptodontidium elatius Gloeodes pomigena
Southern blight	Sclerotium rolfsii Athelia rolfsii [teleomorph]
Thread blight = Hypochnus leaf blight	Corticium stevensii = Pellicularia koleroga = Hypochnus ochroleucus
Valsa canker	Valsa ceratosperma Cytospora sacculus [anamorph]
Violet root rot	Helicobasidium mompa
White root rot	Scytinostroma galactinum = Corticium galactinum
White rot	Botryosphaeria dothidea Fusicoccum aesculi [anamorph]
X-spot = Nigrospora spot	Nigrospora oryzae
Zonate leaf spot	Cristulariella moricola Grovesinia pyramidalis [teleomorph]

== Nematodes, parasitic ==
Nematodes, parasitic
Dagger nematode	Xiphinema americanum Xiphinema rivesi Xiphinema vuittenezi
Lesion nematode	Pratylenchus spp. Pratylenchus penetrans
Pin nematode	Paratylenchus spp.
Ring nematode	Criconemella spp.
Root-knot nematode	Meloidogyne spp.

== Viral diseases ==
Viral diseases
Apple chlorotic leafspot	genus Trichovirus, Apple chlorotic leafspot virus (ACLSV)
Apple dwarf (Malus platycarpa)	Apple stem pitting virus (ASPV) (? not US/CAN)
Apple flat apple	genus Nepovirus, Cherry rasp leaf virus (CRLV)
Apple mosaic	genus Ilarvirus, Apple mosaic virus (ApMV) genus Ilarvirus, Tulare apple mosaic virus (TAMV)
Apple stem grooving = Apple decline of Virginia crab	genus Capillovirus, Apple stem grooving virus (ASGV)
Apple stem pitting = apple Spy 227 epinasty and decline	Apple stem pitting virus (ASPV)
Apple union necrosis and decline	genus Nepovirus, Tomato ringspot virus (ToRSV)

== Viroid diseases ==
Viroid diseases
Swollen apple	Apple fruit crinkle viroid (AFCVd)
Apple dimple fruit	Apple scar skin viroid (ASSVd)
Apple fruit crinkle	Apple fruit crinkle viroid (AFCVd) (Japan)
Apple scar skin = apple dapple, apple sabi-ka, apple bumpy fruit	Apple scar skin viroid (ASSVd)

== Suspected viral- and viroid-like diseases ==
Suspected viral- and viroid-like diseases
Dead spur	GTP, unidentified
False sting	GTP, virus suspected
Green crinkle	GTP, virus suspected
Rough skin	GTP, virus suspected
Star crack	GTP, virus suspected

== Miscellaneous diseases and disorders ==
Miscellaneous diseases and disorders
Bitter pit	Localized calcium deficiency
Blossom blast	Boron deficiency
Burrknot	Genetically predisposed rootstock
Fruit cracking	Genetic
Fruit russet	Frost, sprays, etc.
Green mottle	Unidentified
Hollow apple	High temperature
Internal bark necrosis = measles	Low pH and mineral nutrient imbalance
Internal browning	Boron and calcium deficiencies, etc.
Jonathan spot	Reduced by controlled atmosphere storage
Narrow leaf	Genetic
Necrotic leaf blotch of ‘Golden Delicious’	Rapid synthesis of gibberellins triggered by environmental factors
Spray injury	Spray
Storage scald	Injury to fruit surfaces by naturally occurring gases produced by the fruit
Sunburn	Sun injury to fruit
Sunscald	Freezing of bark following high temperatures in winter
Water core	Sorbitol accumulation

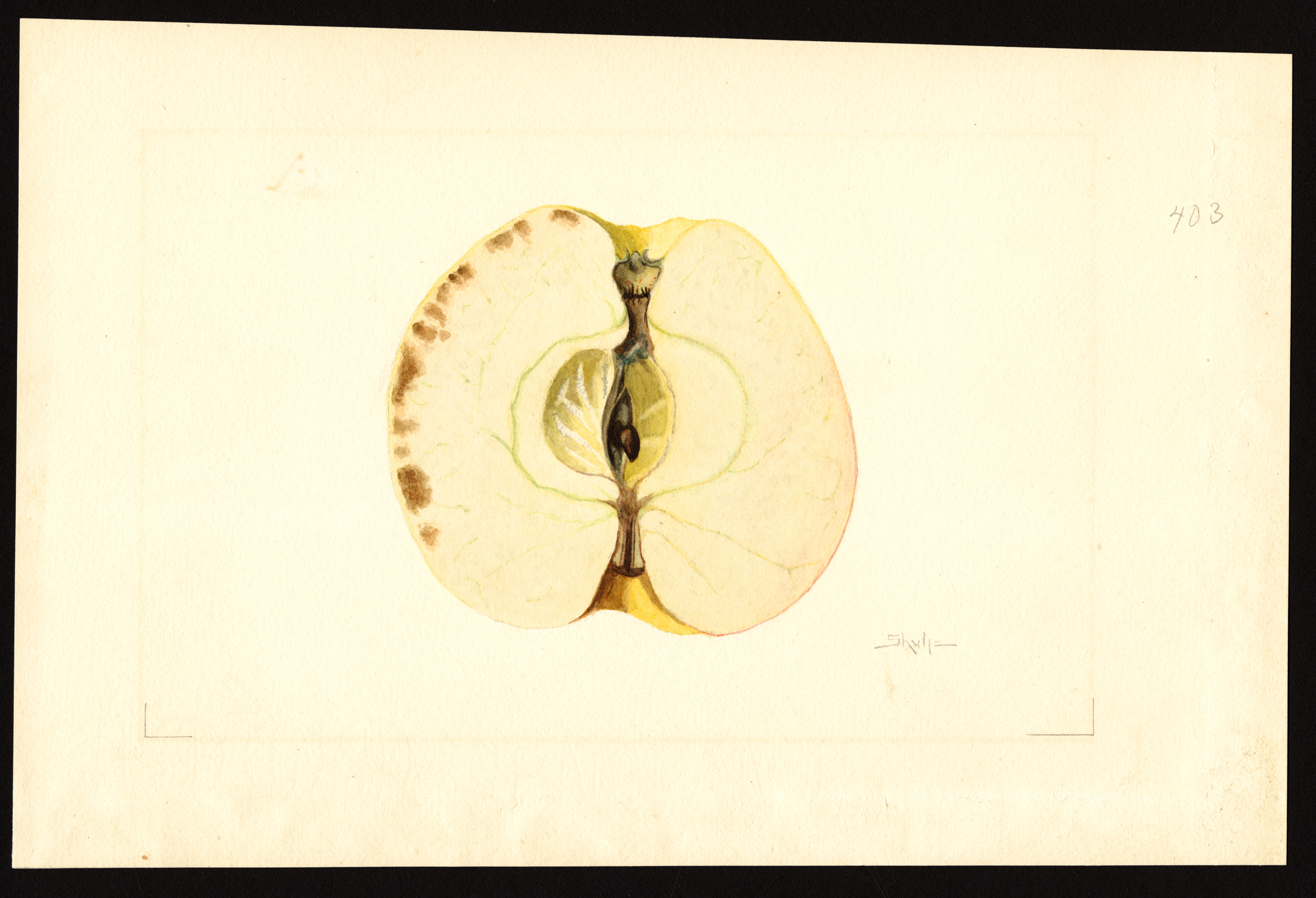
'Bitter pit'

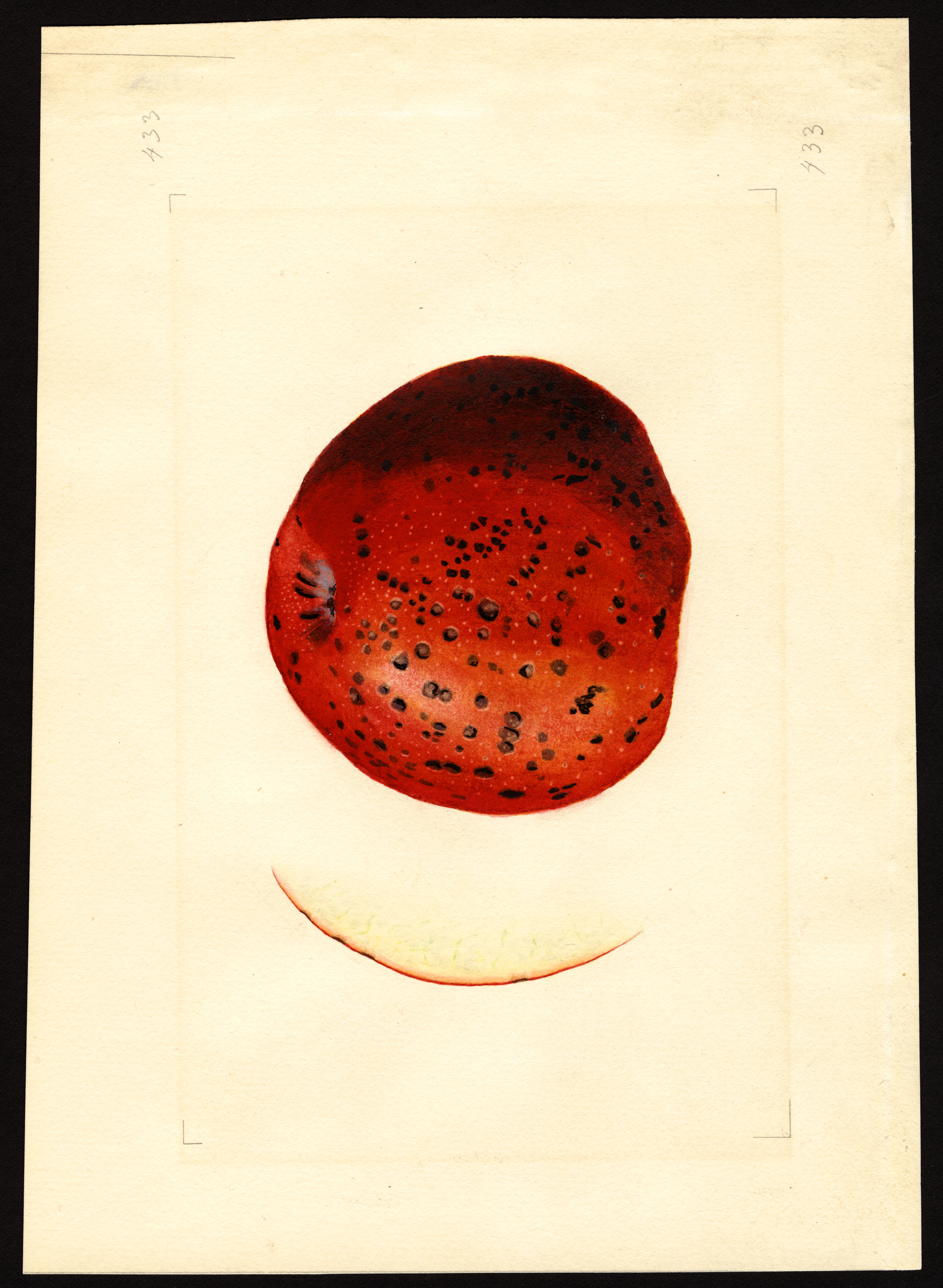
'Jonathan spot'

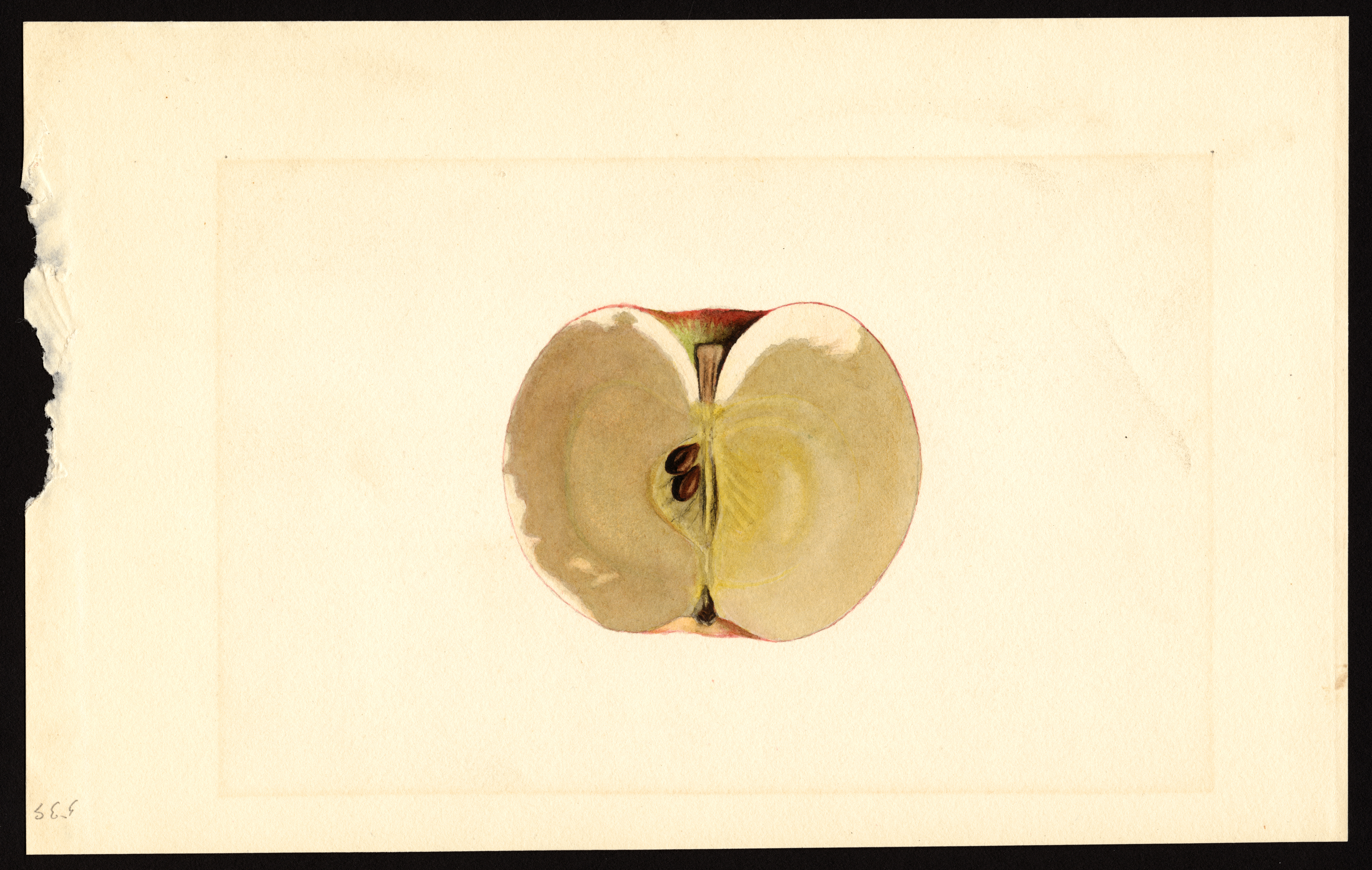
'Water core'

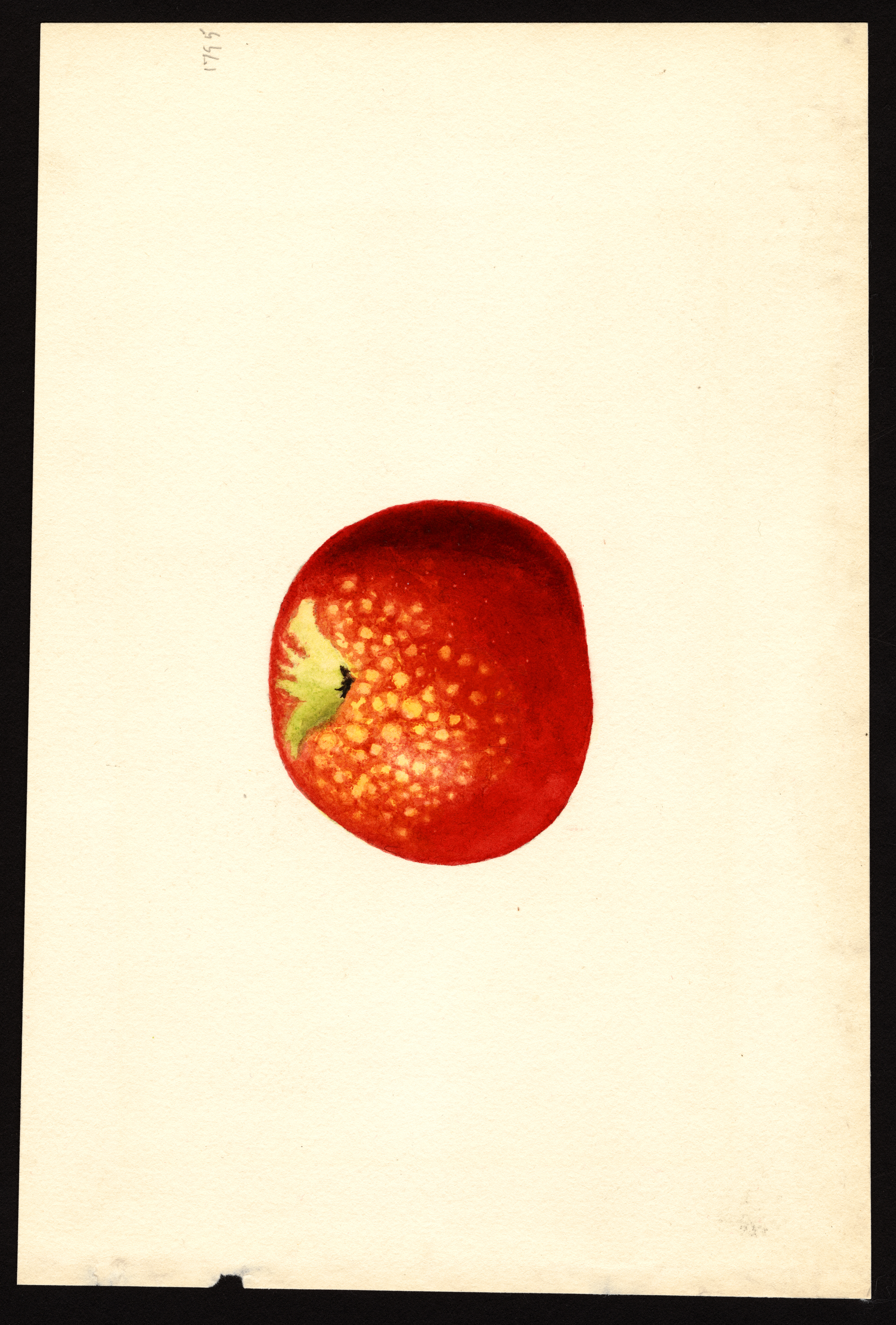
'Spray injury'
