= Sooty blotch and flyspeck =

Fungal plant disease

Sooty blotch and flyspeck (SBFS) or apple summer disease is a plant disease caused by a complex of saprophytic fungi which colonize the epicuticular wax layer of apple (Malus x domestica Borkh.). It is found worldwide in regions with moist growing seasons.

== Description ==
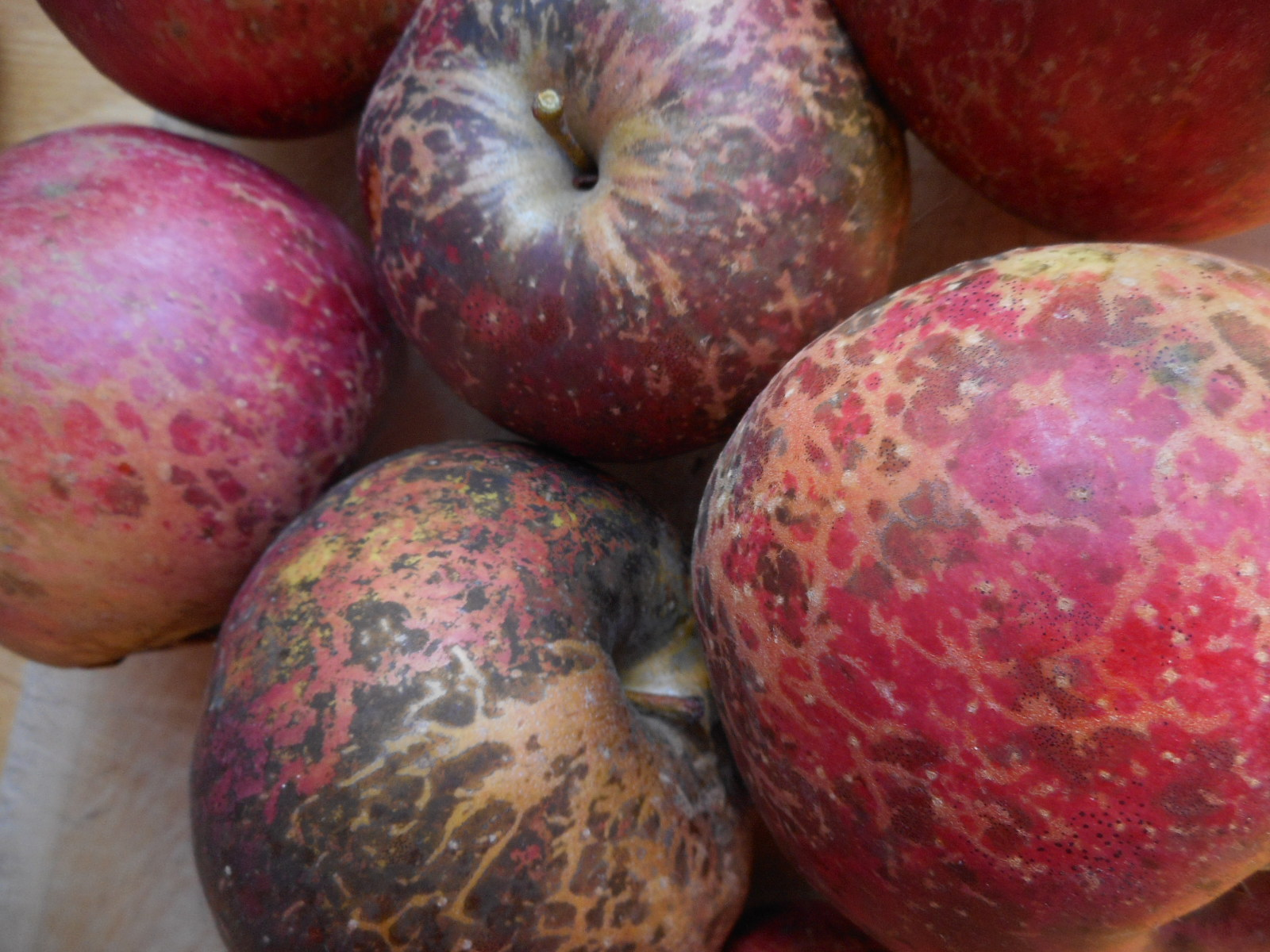
Haralson with its typical peel coloration from sooty blotch and flyspeck

Sooty blotch and flyspeck is a descriptive term for a condition of darkly pigmented blemishes and smudges caused by a number of different fungi affecting fruit including apples, pear, persimmon, banana, papaya, and several other cultivated tree and vine crops. The greenish black coating resembling soot or flyspeck-like dots grow into irregular stains and blotches during the summer or growing season. They can grow into each other and may cover the entire fruit surface. Frequently blotches run down in a track resembling tears (German: "Regenfleckenkrankheit"). The blotches can be removed by vigorous rubbing or be scratched off revealing a normal peel. Symptoms can be seen particularly well when apples are light or green colored. Late varieties are more susceptible, because the disease builds over a longer growing period.

== Risk factors ==
Moist and cool weather favors the infection. Orchards with shade or regions near bodies of water with frequent morning dew are especially prone to disease. Infections can occur from June until autumn. Secondary infections are caused by conidia, which are transported by wind and rain onto other developing fruit. The first visible signs of SBFS colonies appear about 3 weeks after infection.

== Biology ==
Microscopically, the flyspeck-like spots and sooty blemishes are fungal mycelium adhering to fruit. The fungi live as saprophytes on the wax layer surface of apples and do not invade the peel. The hyphae, fruiting bodies, and survival structures of these fungi become melanized over time. SBFS fungi also grow on the surfaces of stems, twigs, leaves, and fruit of a wide range of wild plants.

=== History of discovery ===
In an 1832 paper written in Latin and published in Philadelphia, Ludwig Schweinitz described the first sooty blotch species as a fungus he named 'Dothidea pomigena'. It remained the sole species established as a cause until the beginning of the 1990s. In 1920, sooty blotch and flyspeck were mentioned together for the first time, blotch caused by Dothidea, renamed as Gloeodes pomigena and flyspeck caused by Schizothyrium pomi, respectively. Over the next 80 years various different looks of mycelia, that is morphologies were described.

By the end of the 20th century three more fungal species had been identified as causes of sooty blotch on North Carolina apples, still based on their morphological type: Peltaster fructicola, Geastrumia polystigmatis and Leptodontium elatius. The authors broke ground after 160 years of "confusion", stating that "sooty blotch fungi are difficult to isolate due to many contaminating microorganisms on the surface of plant parts". Also, fruiting structures -a major part of morphological identification- are rare on apple peels. The authors went back to the original historical deposits at the herbarium of the Academy of Natural Sciences in Philadelphia and found no conidia. They coined the term 'apple sooty blotch complex' for this group of fungi, which they suspected would include more.

As soon as DNA sequence-based methods were used, many more fungi were found and new species and genera described. A sample from nine orchards in four Midwestern states near the cities of Indianola, Pella, Iowa Falls in Iowa, Rockford, Illinois, Simpson and Chester in Illinois, Mooresville and New Franklin in Missouri and New Munster, Wisconsin grew 422 isolates. Their 1 month old DNA was extracted and two regions, ITS1 and 28S ribosomal RNA sequenced. Parsimony analysis, bootstrapping and the minimum evolution principle led to groups of species, further described by conidial and colony morphology. The species were re-inoculated into apples grown at an Iowa State University research station in Gilbert, Iowa, re-isolated, sequenced, and morphology compared. Thirty isolates fulfilled Koch’s postulates as new species, all Dothideomycetes, 27 were within Dothideales, one was within Pleosporales and two with undetermined ordinal level. Only 2 species (Peltaster fructicola and Zygophiala jamaicensis) had previously been associated with SBFS.

A 2008 publication of the same sample plus a 2005 sample of 30 more orchards in 10 eastern U.S. states, (39 US apple orchards in 14 states) speciated by DNA- and phylogenetic analyses reported 58 putative species belonging to the Dothideomycetes, 52 of which were Capnodiales, and 36 were part of the Mycosphaerellaceae. Thus the SBFS species diversity had been underestimated by more than tenfold. The number of species per orchard varied from 2 to 15, with a higher diversity the longer an orchard had not been sprayed with fungicide.with blotch and flyspeck signs, reported four species of Zygophiala (Schizothyriaceae, Capnodiales), three of them newly identified. Schizothyrium pomi, Peltaster fructicola, and Pseudocercosporella sp. RH1, were found in nearly every geographic region. Certain species, such as Stomiopeltis sp. RS5.2, Phialophora sessilis, and Geastrumia polystigmatis, were found only in certain regions, leading to the conclusion that SBFS species differ geographically.

Since then, slow-growing epiphytic fungi often belonging to the Capnodiales have been identified (Gleason et al. 2011), and a new species in 2014, Peltaster cerophilus from Europe.

=== Diversity ===
Most fungi are part of the Ascomycetes. The composition of the fungal complex varies depending on the region. Their complete life cycle is as of yet unknown. The fungi are hibernating on wild plants like willow, ash or brambles, which are the locus of primary infections. Whether fungi stay within apple orchards is unknown. They probably thrive on apple juice, which exits through minute tears of the cuticula during growth.

Flyspeck disease is caused by Schizothyrium pomi. It causes sharply demarcated grey blotches consisting of many small black flyspeck like dots. They can be rubbed off like sooty blotch, but no tear formation occurs. Fruit develop normally. Flyspeck frequently occurs in older trees with light colored peels (Golden Delicious, etc.). Because of their similarity the two diseases are often combined as sooty blotch and flyspeck ("Regenfleckenkrankheit" in German).

== Effect ==
The blotches are cosmetic damage "unacceptable to consumers" and downgrade fruit from premium fresh-market grade to processing use, i.e. reduce its market value, but leaf and fruit development are not affected.

== Control ==
Preventive measures are pruning which allows light and air to enter the tree, to achieve fast drying. Strong growth within the root area dams up moisture and facilitates infection.

A prognostic model called Sooty Blotch RIMpro has been developed, which still awaits validation. Similar to the apple scab model it numerically grades risk and degree of infection and can serve as a warning system. It allows conventional growers to spray more targeted. The parameters for calculation are wetness of leaves, amount of rain fall and temperature.

Conventional orchards that spray fungicides against apple scab, treat soot blotch and flyspeck at the same time. Therefore, the problem is not seen in conventional non-resistant varieties. However, scab-resistant varieties, which are not sprayed frequently show the infection. In organic orchards, spraying 4–5 with lime sulphur or coco soap during the main infectious periods is recommended.

== See also ==
- Sooty mold
- Apple scab
