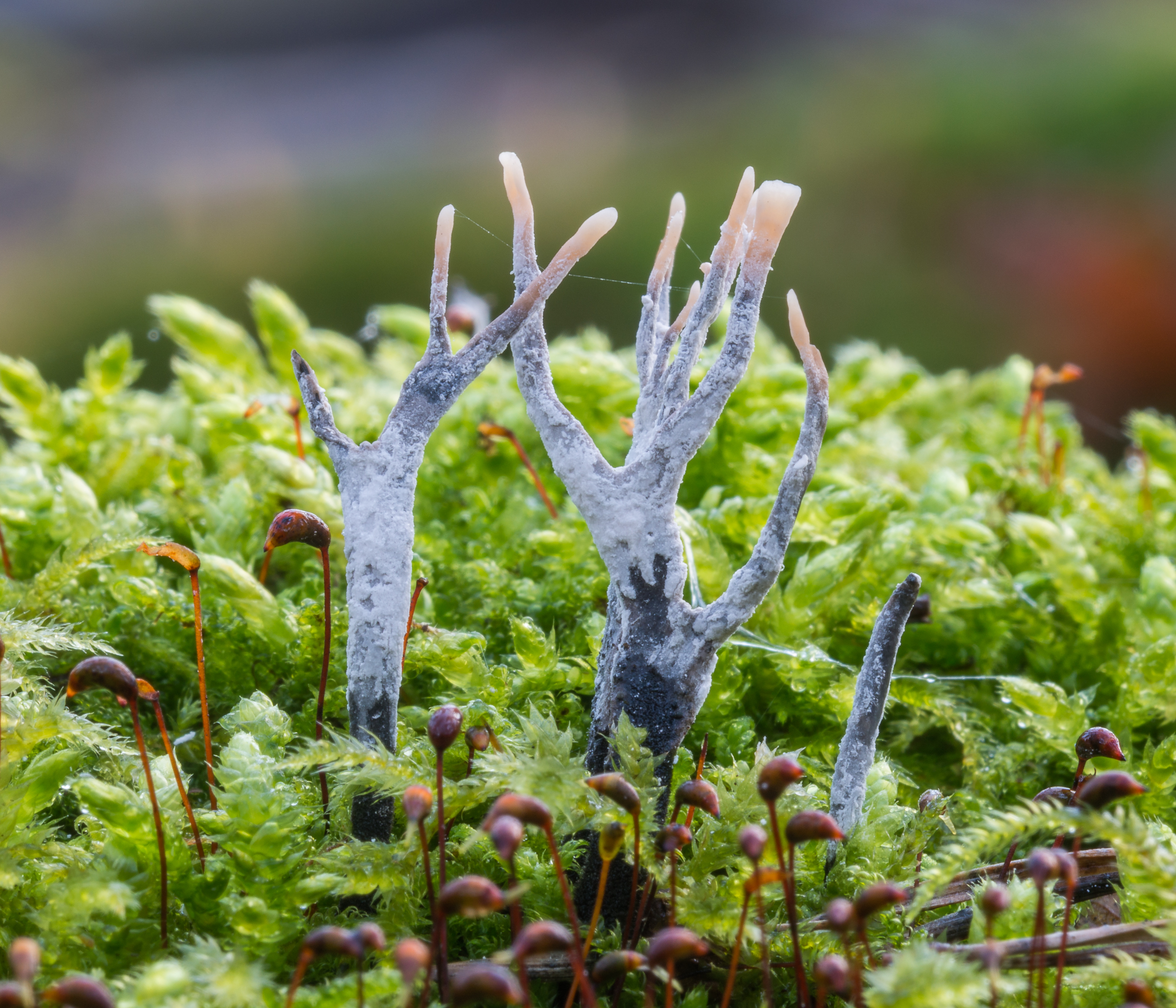

Scientific classification
- Kingdom: Fungi
- Division: Ascomycota
- Class: Sordariomycetes
- Order: Xylariales
- Family: Xylariaceae
- Genus: Xylaria
- Species: X. hypoxylon

Binomial name
- Xylaria hypoxylon (L.) Grev.(1824)

Synonyms
- Clavaria hypoxylon L.; Sphaeria hypoxylon (L.) Pers.; Xylosphaera hypoxylon (L.) Dumort.

= Xylaria hypoxylon =

Species of fungus

Xylaria hypoxylon
- Mycological characteristics
- Smooth hymenium
- No distinct cap
- Hymenium attachment is not applicable
- Lacks a stipe
- Spore print is black to white
- Edibility is inedible

Xylaria hypoxylon is a species of bioluminescent fungus in the family Xylariaceae. (Note: X. hypoxylon is the only known bioluminescent fungus outside of Ordo Agaricales; its light is said to be extremely faint, however. (Note: See photos here: Cann, AJ (2017-12-19). "Candlesnuff Luminescence". NatureSpot. Archived from the original on 2023-06-20.)) It is known by a variety of common names, such as the candlestick fungus, the candlesnuff fungus, carbon antlers, or the stag's horn fungus.

The fruit bodies, characterized by erect, elongated black branches with whitened tips, typically grow in clusters on decaying hardwood. The fungus can cause a root rot in hawthorn and gooseberry plants.

== Taxonomy ==
Xylaria hypoxylon was first described by Carl Linnaeus in 1745, and then later mentioned by him in his Species Plantarum II.

The specific epithet is derived from the Greek words hypo meaning "below", and xylon, meaning "wood".

Genetic evidence has created the X. hypoxylon complex. The complex was created when taxonomists and amateurs noticed large variation in appearance and spore shape within the main species and decided that the differences were large enough to warrant a complex formation. This complex has been debated between different experts as valid and invalid for the past three years and has remained in tension.

Though they are similar, the complex does not include Xylaria polymorpha and X. longipes, which look similar but are not closely enough related to X. hypoxylon to apply.

== Description ==
Fruit bodies (ascocarps) are cylindrical or flattened with dimensions of 3–8 centimetres (1 1/8–3 1/8 in) tall × 2–8 mm thick. The erect ascocarps are often twisted or bent, and typically sparsely branched, often in a shape resembling a stag's antlers. Specimens found earlier in the season, in spring, may be covered completely in asexual spores (conidia), which manifests itself as a white to grayish powdery deposit. Later in the season, mature ascocarps are charcoal-black, and have minute pimple-like bumps called perithecia on the surface. These are minute rounded spore bearing structures with tiny holes, or ostioles, for the release of sexual spores (ascospores). The perithecia are embedded in the flesh of the ascocarp, the stroma, which is tough, elastic, and white. Within the perithecia, the asci are 100 × 8 μm.

Ascospores are kidney-shaped, black, and smooth, with dimensions of 10–14 × 4–6 μm. The asexual spores (mitospores) are ellipsoid in shape, smooth, and hyaline.

=== Similar species ===
Many species of the genus resemble X. hypoxylon, including X. polymorpha, which is thicker and not as branched.

== Distribution and habitat ==
The fruit bodies typically grow in clusters on decaying hardwood. The fungus can cause a root rot in hawthorn and gooseberry plants.

== Edibility ==
Although not poisonous, the small size and tough texture of this fungus deter consumption. It is considered inedible by some guides.

== Chemical compounds ==
A variety of chemical compounds with in vitro properties have been identified in this fungus. The compounds xylarial A and B both have moderate cytotoxic activity against the human hepatocellular carcinoma cell line Hep G2. The pyrone derivative compounds named xylarone and 8,9-dehydroxylarone also have cytotoxic activity. Several cytochalasins, compounds that bind to actin in muscle tissue, have been found in the fungus. X. hypoxylon also contains a carbohydrate-binding protein, a lectin, with a unique sugar specificity, and which has potent anti-tumor effects in various tumor cell lines.

== See also ==
- List of bioluminescent fungi
- Medicinal mushrooms
