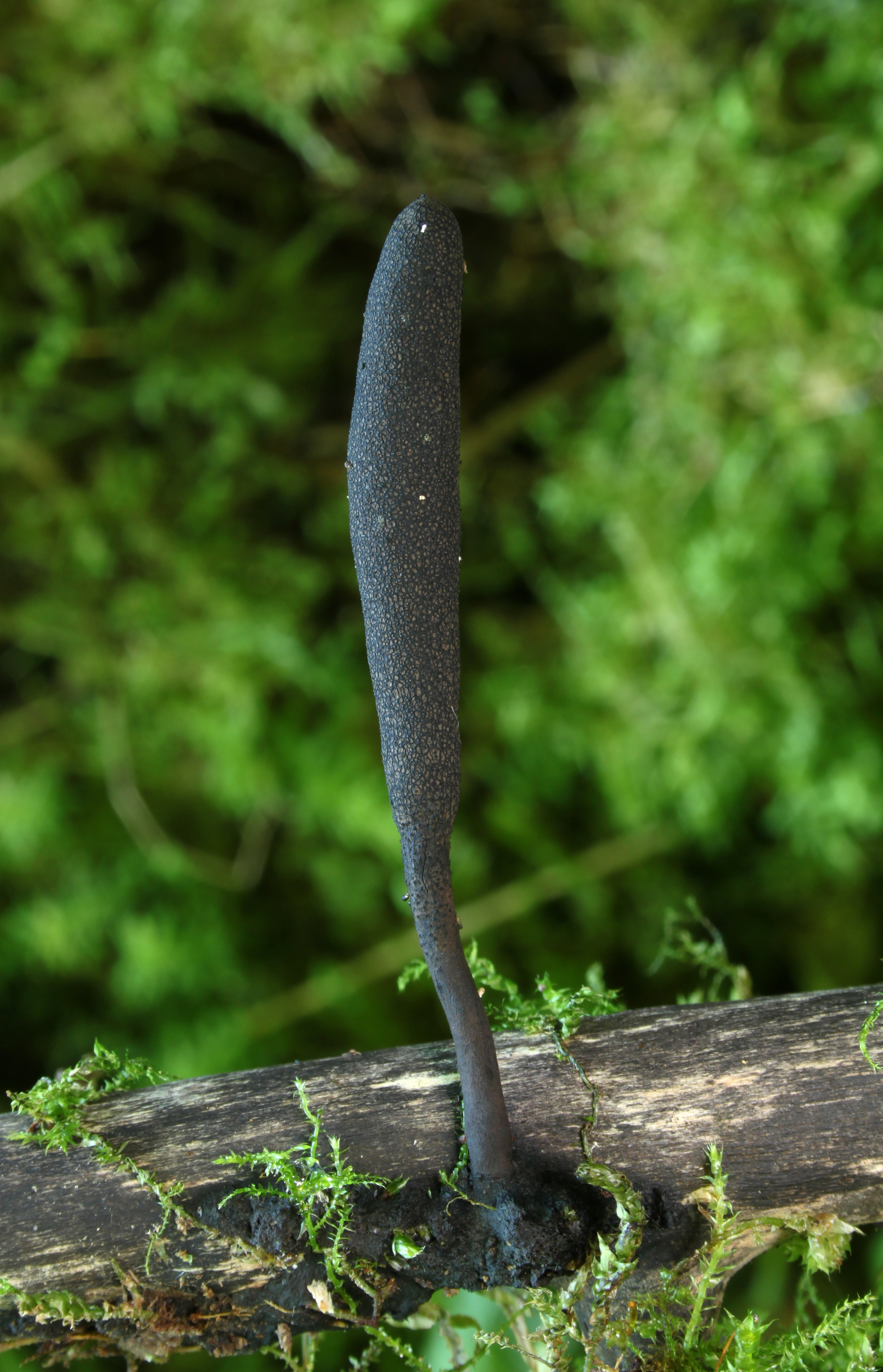

Scientific classification
- Kingdom: Fungi
- Division: Ascomycota
- Class: Sordariomycetes
- Order: Xylariales
- Family: Xylariaceae
- Genus: Xylaria
- Species: X. longipes

Binomial name
- Xylaria longipes Nitschke 1867

Synonyms
- Xylosphaera longipes (Nitschke) Dennis 1958

= Xylaria longipes =

Species of fungus

Xylaria longipes
- Mycological characteristics
- Smooth hymenium
- No distinct cap
- Hymenium attachment is not applicable
- Lacks a stipe
- Spore print is blackish-brown to black
- Ecology is saprotrophic
- Edibility is inedible

Xylaria longipes, commonly known as dead moll's fingers, is a species of fungus in the family Xylariaceae.

== Taxonomy ==
Xylaria longipes was first described by the German botanist and mycologist Theodor Rudolph Joseph Nitschke in the first volume of his Pyrenomycetes Germanici, published in 1867. He gave it the name by which it is currently known. Xylaria is from the Latin xulon, meaning "wood", and aria, meaning "pertaining to", while longipes is from longus, meaning "long", and pes, meaning "foot". The specific name is in reference to the long stem, which is one of the distinguishing features in contrast to Xylaria polymorpha (dead man's fingers). In 1958, the English mycologist and plant pathologist R. W. G. Dennis coined the binomial Xylosphaera longipes, resurrecting the Belgian botanist and politician Barthélemy Charles Joseph Dumortier's 1822 genus Xylosphaera. However, the mycological databases MycoBank and Index Fungorum reject Dennis's name, preferring Nitscke's.

The variety Xylaria longipes var. tropica was described from Mexico in 1989 by Felipe San Martín González and Jack D. Rogers; this is listed on Index Fungorum as synonymous with the nominate variety, but is listed as taxonomically independent on MycoBank. The species is commonly known as "dead moll's fingers".

== Description ==
The species has a roughly club-shaped fruit body measuring from 2 to 8 centimetres (0.79 to 3.1 in) in height, and reaching a thickness of up to 2 centimetres (0.79 in). The top is rounded, while the stem can be fairly long (though is sometimes almost entirely lacking). The colour of the body's surface varies with age; younger specimens fairly gray or fairly brown, but they darken with age, becoming black. As the fruit body ages, the surface cracks and develops scales. X. longipes differs from the similar Xylaria polymorpha (dead man's fingers) by being somewhat more slender, by having a more distinct stalk, and by its smaller spores. While X. longipes has spores measuring 12 to 16 by 5 to 7 micrometres (μm), the spores of X. polymorpha measure 20 to 32 by 5 to 9 μm. The spindle-shaped spores of X. longipes have a smooth surface but for germ slits.

== Distribution and habitat ==
This fungus is known from Europe, Asia, and North America. It is a saprotroph, growing directly from dead wood from hardwoods, including both fallen branches and stumps. It causes soft rot in its host. In Europe, it favours the wood of sycamores, while collections in North America have favoured the wood of maples and beeches. The species can grow singly or in groups, and is more likely to grow singly than X. polymorpha.

== Uses ==
Xylaria longipes is inedible, but a 2008 study concluded that the species could improve wood for the purposes of making violins. A number of chemicals have been derived from the fungus, including the antifungal xylaramide, the antioxidant tyrosol, and a derivative of the antifungal compound sordarin, a chemical first isolated from Sordaria araneosa.
