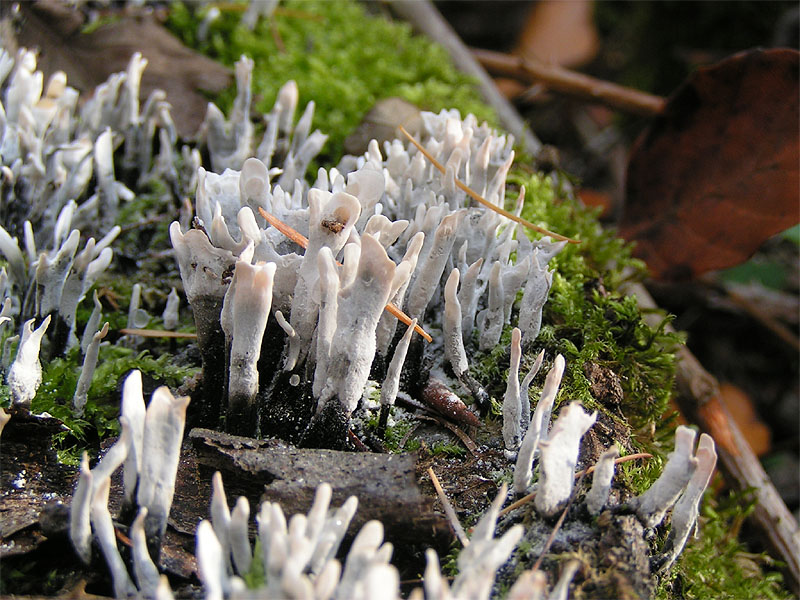
- Xylaria hypoxylon

Scientific classification
- Domain: Eukaryota
- Kingdom: Fungi
- Division: Ascomycota
- Class: Sordariomycetes
- Order: Xylariales
- Family: Xylariaceae
- Genus: Xylaria; Hill ex Schrank (1789)

Type species
- Xylaria hypoxylon (L.) Grev. (1824)

Species
- See text

= Xylaria =

Genus of fungi

Xylaria is a genus of ascomycetous fungi commonly found growing on dead wood. The name comes from the Greek xýlon meaning wood (see xylem).

'Outline of Fungi and fungus-like taxa' by Wijayawardene et al. lists up to c. 571 species (in 2020), and around 454 records are listed by Species Fungorum (including synonyms).

Two of the common species of the genus are Xylaria hypoxylon and Xylaria polymorpha.

Xylaria hypoxylon, known by the common names stag's horn and candle-snuff fungus, is the most conspicuous because of its erect, 3–7 cm tall, antler-like ascocarps (fruitbodies) which are black at the base (where the perithecia are embedded) but white and branched towards the top, where the fruiting bodies produce white conidia (asexual spores).

Xylaria polymorpha, dead man's fingers, often grows in finger-like clusters from the base of a tree or from wood just below ground level. This is a primary fungus utilized in the spalting of sugar maple and other hardwoods.

Xylaria longipes, known by the common name dead moll's fingers, allegedly improves the quality of the wood used in string instruments. It has not been linked to spalting of maple.

== Species ==
Species in the genus include:

- Xylaria aburiensis
- Xylaria acerata
- Xylaria acuminatilongissima
- Xylaria alata
- Xylaria albisquamula
- Xylaria albocincta
- Xylaria albocinctoides
- Xylaria amphithele
- Xylaria angulosa
- Xylaria anisopleura
- Xylaria apiculata
- Xylaria apoda
- Xylaria arbuscula
- Xylaria asperata
- Xylaria assamensis
- Xylaria atrodivaricata
- Xylaria atroglobosa
- Xylaria atrosphaerica
- Xylaria avellana
- Xylaria ayresii
- Xylaria azadirachtae
- Xylaria bambooensis
- Xylaria bambusicola
- Xylaria berkeleyi
- Xylaria bicampaniformis
- Xylaria bissei
- Xylaria boergesenii
- Xylaria brevicephala
- Xylaria brunneovinosa
- Xylaria bulbosa
- Xylaria candelabrum
- Xylaria carabayensis
- Xylaria carpophila
- Xylaria castilloi
- Xylaria castorea
- Xylaria chardoniana
- Xylaria choui
- Xylaria cinerea
- Xylaria citrispora
- Xylaria claviceps
- Xylaria clusiae
- Xylaria comosoides
- Xylaria compuncta
- Xylaria coprinicola
- Xylaria coprophila
- Xylaria cordovensiformis
- Xylaria coremiifera
- Xylaria corniformis
- Xylaria cornu-damae
- Xylaria cranioides
- Xylaria crozonensis
- Xylaria cubensis
- Xylaria culicicephala
- Xylaria culleniae
- Xylaria cupressoides
- Xylaria curta
- Xylaria dennisii
- Xylaria digitata
- Xylaria diminuta
- Xylaria discolor
- Xylaria duranii
- Xylaria enteroleuca
- Xylaria eugeniae
- Xylaria exalbida
- Xylaria feejeensis
- Xylaria ficicola
- Xylaria filiformis
- Xylaria filiformoidea
- Xylaria fioriana
- Xylaria formosana
- Xylaria fraseri
- Xylaria friesii
- Xylaria frustrulata
- Xylaria furcata
- Xylaria galandii
- Xylaria glebulosa
- Xylaria gracillima
- Xylaria grammica
- Xylaria griseo-olivacea
- Xylaria griseosepiacea
- Xylaria guaranitica
- Xylaria guareae
- Xylaria guazumae
- Xylaria guepinii
- Xylaria hainanensis
- Xylaria heliscus
- Xylaria himalayensis
- Xylaria hippotrichoides
- Xylaria hypoxylon
- Xylaria hypsipoda
- Xylaria intracolorata
- Xylaria intraflava
- Xylaria jaliscoensis
- Xylaria jolyana
- Xylaria jiangsuensis – China
- Xylaria kamatii
- Xylaria karsticola
- Xylaria kaumanae
- Xylaria kretzschmarioidea
- Xylaria lechatii
- Xylaria lepidota
- Xylaria liquidambaris
- Xylaria longipes
- Xylaria louisii
- Xylaria luteostromata
- Xylaria macrospora
- Xylaria magniannulata
- Xylaria magnoliae
- Xylaria maitlandii
- Xylaria mali
- Xylaria maraca
- Xylaria maumeei
- Xylaria meliacearum
- Xylaria mellissii
- Xylaria memecyli
- Xylaria mesenterica
- Xylaria mexicana
- Xylaria michoacana
- Xylaria microceras
- Xylaria minuta
- Xylaria moelleroclavus
- Xylaria moliwensis
- Xylaria monstrosa
- Xylaria montagnei
- Xylaria mornandii
- Xylaria multipartita
- Xylaria multiplex
- Xylaria musooriensis
- Xylaria mycelioides
- Xylaria myosurus
- Xylaria myrosimila
- Xylaria nigromedullosa
- Xylaria obovata
- Xylaria ochraceostroma
- Xylaria opulenta
- Xylaria oxyacanthae
- Xylaria palmicola
- Xylaria papulis
- Xylaria papyrifera
- Xylaria paulistana
- Xylaria perezsilvae
- Xylaria petchii
- Xylaria pisoniae
- Xylaria platypoda
- Xylaria plumbea
- Xylaria polymorpha
- Xylaria polyramosa
- Xylaria polytricha
- Xylaria ponapeana
- Xylaria potentillae
- Xylaria praefecta
- Xylaria primorskensis
- Xylaria psamathos
- Xylaria pseudoapiculata
- Xylaria psidii
- Xylaria pterula
- Xylaria punjabensis
- Xylaria queenslandica
- Xylaria quercinophila
- Xylaria ramosa
- Xylaria ramus
- Xylaria reperta
- Xylaria reticulata
- Xylaria rhopaloides
- Xylaria rimulata
- Xylaria rosea
- Xylaria salonensis
- Xylaria sanchezii
- Xylaria scabriclavula
- Xylaria schreuderiana
- Xylaria scopiformis
- Xylaria semiglobosa – China
- Xylaria sibirica
- Xylaria sicula
- Xylaria sphaerica – China
- Xylaria squamulosa
- Xylaria stilbohypoxyloides
- Xylaria stromafera
- Xylaria subcoccophora
- Xylaria symploci
- Xylaria tanganyikaensis
- Xylaria tectonae
- Xylaria tenuispora
- Xylaria terminaliae-bellericae
- Xylaria terminaliae-crenulatae
- Xylaria terricola
- Xylaria thailandica – southern Thailand
- Xylaria theissenii
- Xylaria thindii
- Xylaria tischeri
- Xylaria tolosa
- Xylaria tuberiformis
- Xylaria tucumanensis
- Xylaria tumulosa
- Xylaria umbonata
- Xylaria uniapiculata
- Xylaria vaporaria
- Xylaria vasconica
- Xylaria wellingtonensis
- Xylaria wulaiensis
- Xylaria zealandica

== Gallery ==
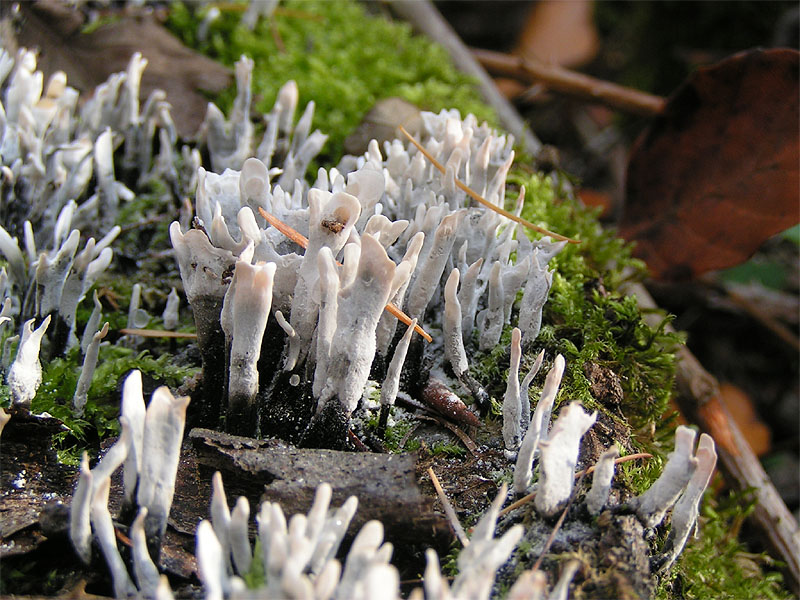
X. hypoxylon

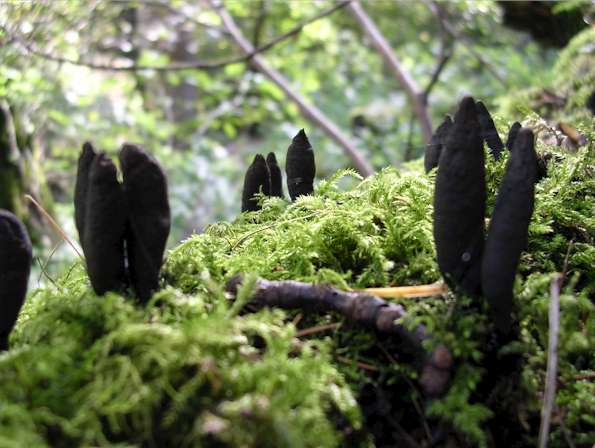
X. polymorpha

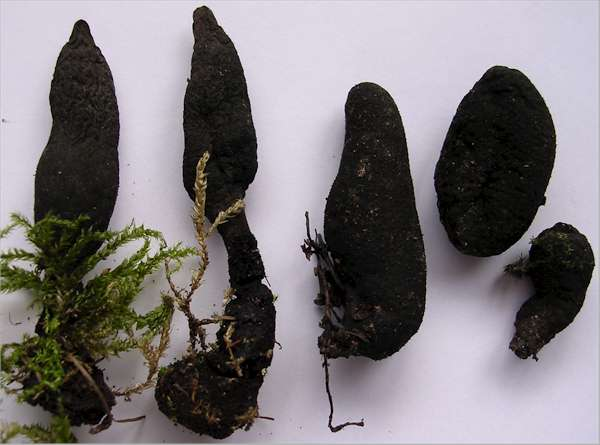
X. polymorpha illustrating the range of shapes of fruiting bodies.

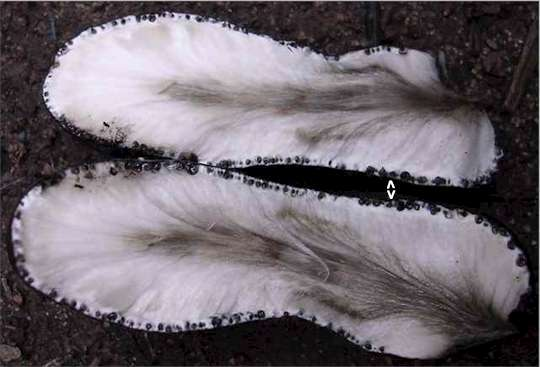
A longitudinally split fruiting body of X. polymorpha, showing the many perithecia that lie just beneath the black outer rind.

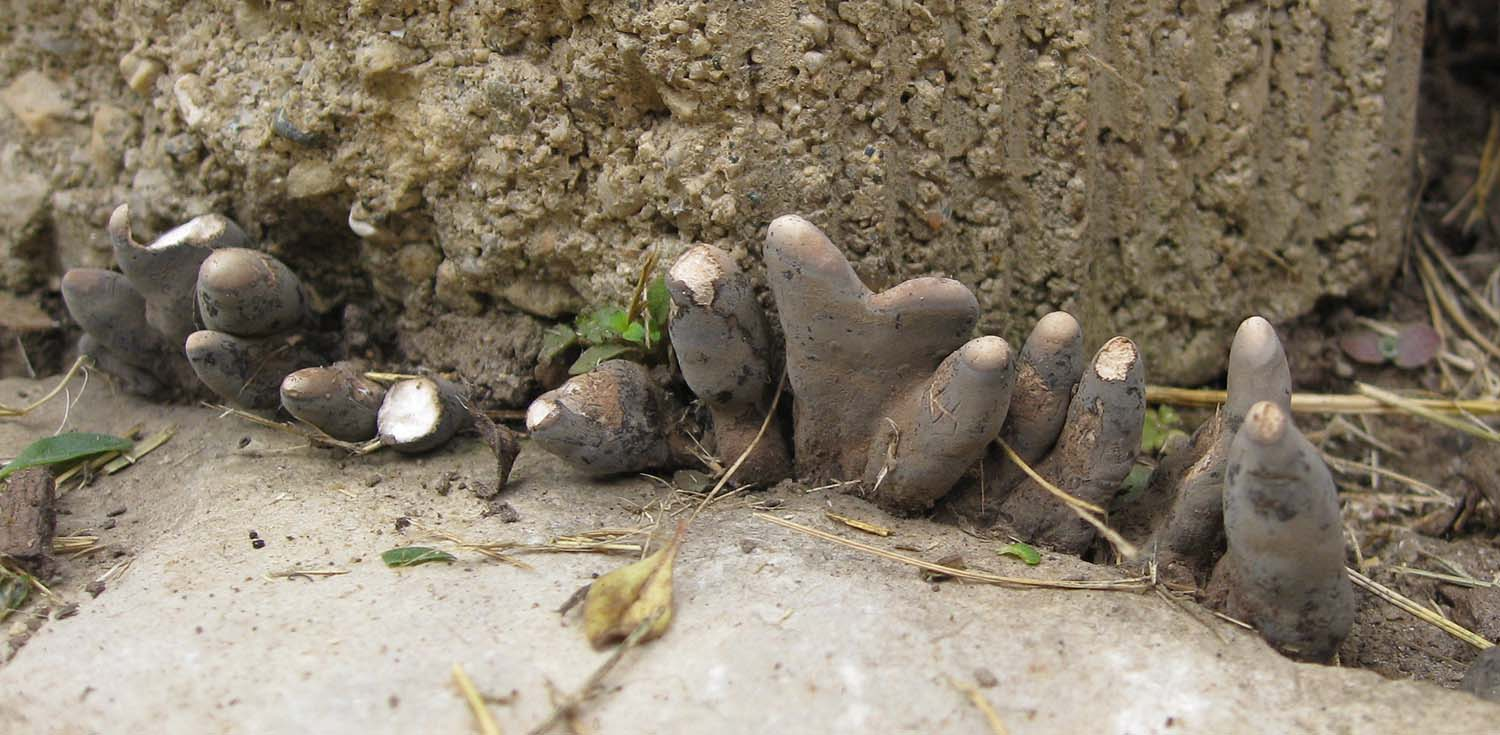
X. polymorpha in early July

== See also ==
- Xylarium

== Other sources ==
- Deacon, J. Fungal Biology. Blackwell Publishing. 2005.
- Robinson, S. C. and P. E. Laks. 2010. Culture age and wood species affect zone line production of Xylaria polymorpha. The Open Mycology Journal 4:18-21.
- Robinson, S. C., et al. 2012. Promoting fungal pigment formation in wood by utilizing a modified decay jar method. Wood Science and Technology 46:841-849.
- Robinson, S. C., et al. Methods of inoculating Acer spp., Populus tremuloides, and Fagus grandifolia logs for commercial spalting applications. Journal of Wood Science in press. doi:10.1007/s10086-013-1335-5
