= Leptodontidium =

Scientific classification
- Domain: Eukaryota
- Kingdom: Fungi
- Division: Ascomycota
- Class: Leotiomycetes
- Order: Helotiales
- Family: Leptodontidiaceae
- Genus: Leptodontidium de Hoog (1979)

Type species
- Leptodontidium elatius (F.Mangenot) de Hoog (1979)

Synonyms
- Leptodontium de Hoog (1977)

Genus of fungi

Leptodontidium is a genus of fungi belonging to the family Leptodontidiaceae. The genus was circumscribed by G. Sybren de Hoog in 1979.

== Species ==
As of May 2024, Species Fungorum (in the Catalogue of Life) accepts 11 species of Leptodontidium:

- Leptodontidium aciculare V.Rao & de Hoog (1986)
- Leptodontidium aureum Hern.-Restr., Guarro & Gené (2017)
- Leptodontidium beauverioides (de Hoog) de Hoog (1979)
- Leptodontidium boreale (de Hoog) de Hoog (1979)
- Leptodontidium camptobactrum (de Hoog) de Hoog (1979)
- Leptodontidium cubense R.F.Castañeda (1988)
- Leptodontidium diaphanulum (Cooke) Baral (2020)
- Leptodontidium irregulare (de Hoog) de Hoog (1979)
- Leptodontidium obscurum (de Hoog) de Hoog (1979)
- Leptodontidium quercuum Tsuneda, N.Maek. & Currah (1996)
- Leptodontidium trabinellum (P.Karst.) Baral, Platas & R.Galán (2015)
