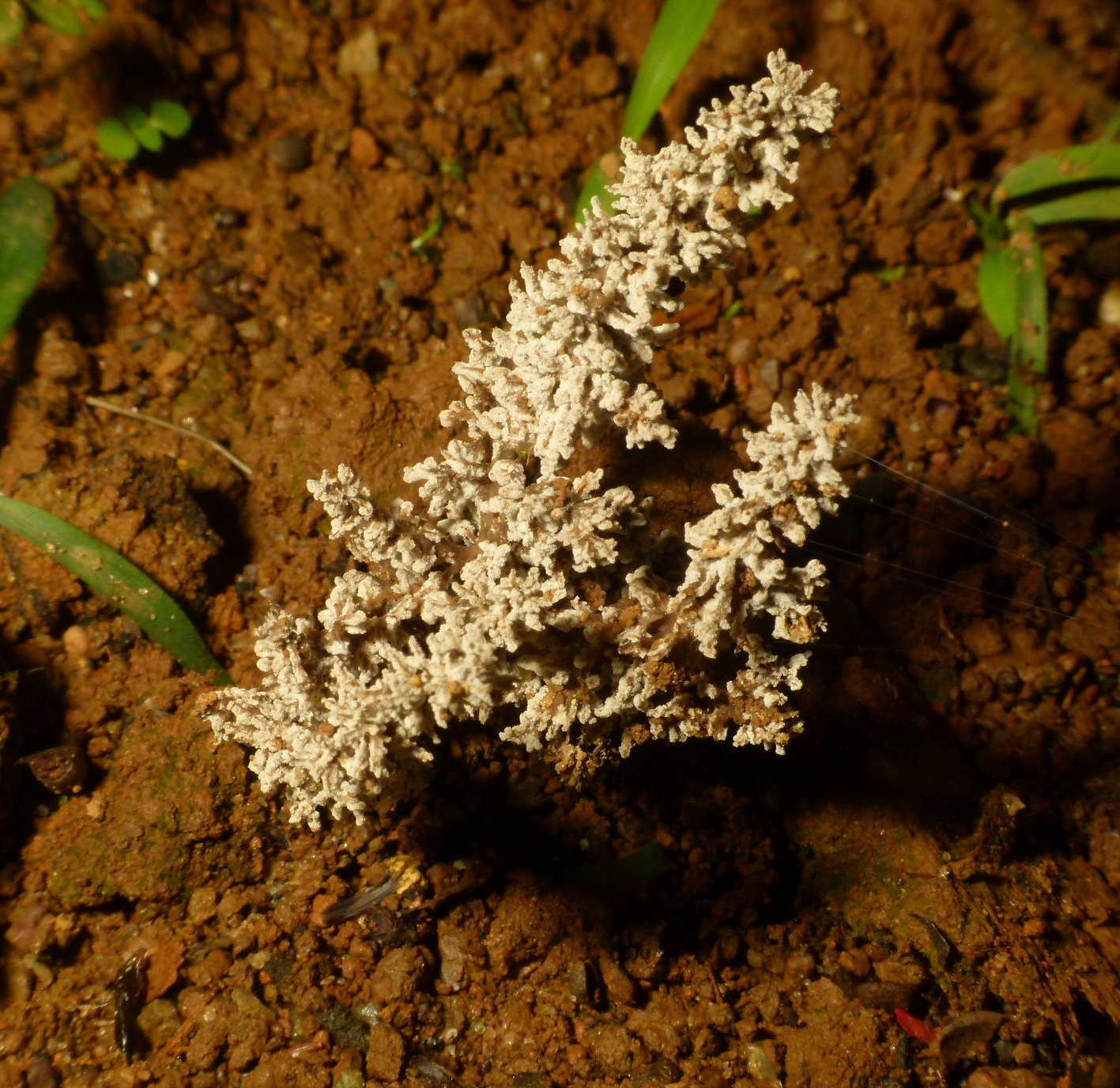
- Anamorph from the Western Ghats, India

Scientific classification
- Domain: Eukaryota
- Kingdom: Fungi
- Division: Ascomycota
- Class: Sordariomycetes
- Order: Xylariales
- Family: Xylariaceae
- Genus: Xylaria
- Species: X. terricola

Binomial name
- Xylaria terricola Ju, Hsieh & Chou, 2017

= Xylaria terricola =

Species of fungus

Xylaria terricola is a species of terrestrial fungus known from tropical Asia. It produces an asexual branching structure with a single stem as an anamorph and no teleomorph or sexual state has been recorded. While other Xylaria species have been found to have termitophilous associations, there is no evidence of X. terricola being in any such association and grows out of soil.

The species was described from Taiwan in 2017 as arising from the soil with a main axis to about 2-5 cm height. There is repeated branching of the structures ending in gray conidium bearing parts. The stipe is black and glabrous with the interior gray to brown. The species is known only from the anamorph and no teleomorphic structures have been observed. The stromata resemble that of Xyloroemium flabelliformis and while most Xylaria produce anamorph and teleomorphs from the same stromata, it has been suggested that the teleomorph may possibly arise from separate stromata as in Xyloroemium. Several Xylaria species are known to be associated with termite nests, growing from the fungus combs of the termites, but many grow on rotting wood and other substrates. No specific substrate was traceable in Xylaria terricola and it appears to grow in soil. The termitophilic Xylaria species are placed in the subgenus Pseudoxylaria. DNA sequence analysis places Xylaria terricola within the termitophile clade.
