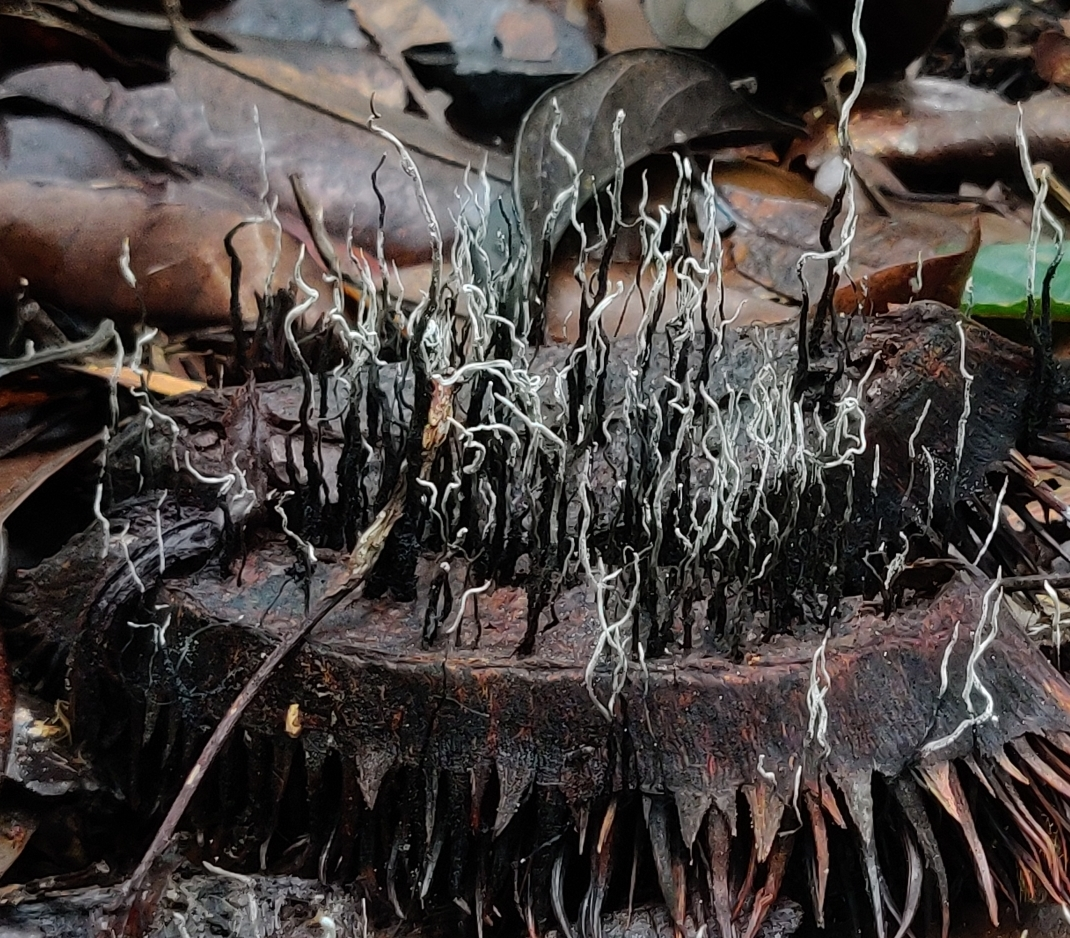

Scientific classification
- Kingdom: Fungi
- Division: Ascomycota
- Class: Sordariomycetes
- Order: Xylariales
- Family: Xylariaceae
- Genus: Xylaria
- Species: X. culleniae

Binomial name
- Xylaria culleniae Berk. & Broome, 1873

= Xylaria culleniae =

Species of fungus

Xylaria culleniae
- Mycological characteristics
- Smooth hymenium
- No distinct cap
- Hymenium attachment is not applicable
- Lacks a stipe
- Spore print is brown
- Ecology is saprotrophic
- Edibility is unknown

Xylaria culleniae is a species of fungus in the family Xylariaceae. This species known to grow on dried fruits and seeds.

== Taxonomy ==
Xylaria culleniae belongs to the family Xylariaceae. The species grows on fruits and seeds are generally considered as host-specific. This species was collected from Sri Lanka during July 1868 by George Gardner (botanist) and George Henry Kendrick Thwaites who was superintendent of the botanical gardens at Peradeniya, Ceylon. The specimens were sent for identification to Royal Botanic Gardens, Kew in 1872. There English botanists and mycologists Miles Joseph Berkeley and Christopher Edmund Broome described this species in 1873.

== Distribution ==
This species is reported from Sri Lanka, China, Thailand and Anaimalai Hills Southern Western Ghats, India. This species is also known to occur in Central America, South America and Africa.

== Description ==
The fruit bodies are erect, elongated black branches, whitened from midway to tips. The hairs of stem is septate. The ascospores (fruit bodies) of X. culleniae relatively smaller and the stromata are generally less robust. Spore dimensions are 8.5-9.5 X 3.5-4.5 μm. Sporidia .016 X .005 - .006 mm. Color of the spores are brown and are ellipsoid or inequilateral in shape. Germ slit is straight and long. Length of stroma is up to 7 cm. Stromata unbranched or branched, cylindrical, long conical. Texture soft. Perithecia 0.1-0.3 mm diam. Ostioles minutely papillate.

== Hosts plants ==
X. culleniae are recorded growing on Cullenia exarillata pods hence the species name culleniae. It is assumed to be host-specific, however it has been recorded growing on and Inga sp. fruits which is a Legume. Hence their host specificity is uncertain.

== See also ==
Cullenia exarillata
