= Neofabraea perennans =

Scientific classification
- Kingdom: Fungi
- Division: Ascomycota
- Class: Leotiomycetes
- Order: Helotiales
- Family: Dermateaceae
- Genus: Neofabraea
- Species: N. perennans

Binomial name
- Neofabraea perennans Kienholz, (1939)

Synonyms
- Cryptosporiopsis perennans (Zeller & Childs) Wollenw., (1939); Gloeosporium perennans Zeller & Childs, (1925); Pezicula perennans (Kienholz) Dugan, (1993)

Species of fungus

Neofabraea perennans is a plant pathogen.
