= Apple chat fruit MLO =

Disease of apple trees

- Common names: apple small fruit, chat fruit of apple
- Causal agents: Phytoplasma
- Hosts: apple trees
- Distribution: Europe, parts of North America, South Africa, New Zealand
- Symptoms: delayed fruit development, smaller green apples during harvest, delayed fruit drop, circular spots on the apples
- Treatment: precautions during grafting

Apple chat fruit MLO, also known as "apple small fruit" and "chat fruit of apple", is a mycoplasma-like organism (MLO) that affects only apple trees, specifically Lord Lambourne and Tydeman's Early Worcester, though in North America, Turley, Winesap, Jonathan, and Golden Delicious can be affected. Symptoms include delayed fruit development, smaller green apples during harvest, delayed fruit drop, and circular spots on the apples themselves. The disease is widespread throughout Europe, especially England and Wales, but is also present in parts of North America, South Africa, and New Zealand. There are no known insect vectors and no transmission method other than grafting is known. The disease itself is not fully systemic and virulency is varied among individuals.

== See also ==
- List of apple diseases
