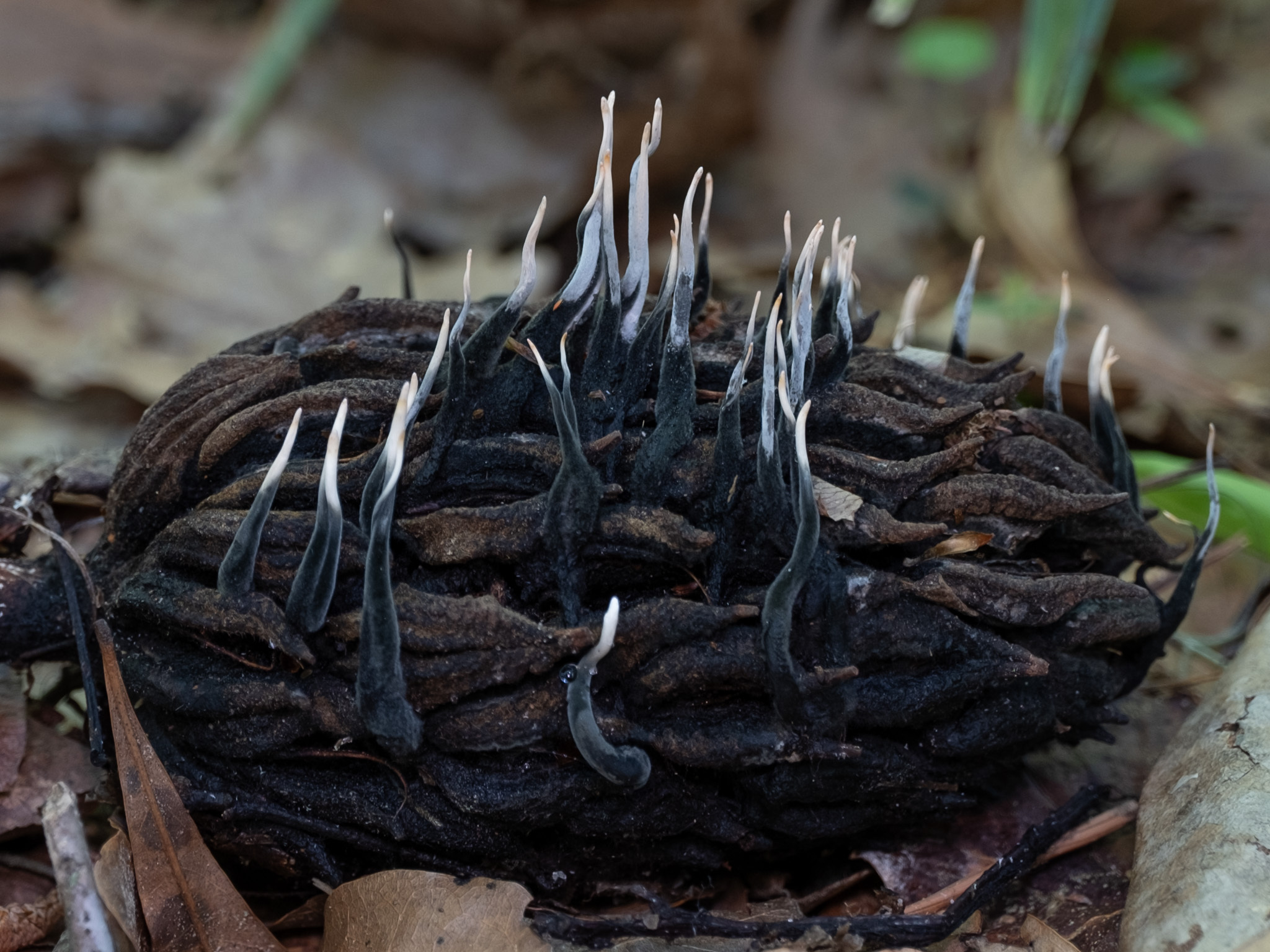
- Xylaria magnoliae on a decaying magnolia fruit

Scientific classification
- Kingdom: Fungi
- Division: Ascomycota
- Class: Sordariomycetes
- Order: Xylariales
- Family: Xylariaceae
- Genus: Xylaria
- Species: X. magnoliae

Binomial name
- Xylaria magnoliae J.D. Rogers

Synonyms
- Xylaria magnoliae var. microspora J.D. Rogers, Y.M. Ju & Whalley

= Xylaria magnoliae =

Species of fungus

Xylaria magnoliae, the magnolia-cone xylaria, is a species of sac fungus of a family of mostly wood-decaying species, the Xylariaceae. This species inhabits only decaying magnolia fruits.

== Description ==
Most small Xylaria with pointed tops are hard to identify to species level, often requiring microscopic examination. Xylaria magnoliae is an exception, because it grows only on decaying cones of magnolia trees. Other than that, here are some easily observable features:

- Fruiting bodies, lacking a well defined stem, are tough, more or less cylindric and gradually narrow upward to a sharp point. They are up to 65 mm (2 1/2 in) long and 3 mm (1/8 in) thick, occasionally with branched bodies.
- During the spring and early summer, during the asexual stage, the smooth fruiting bodies are dusted with a grayish to whitish covering.
- By late summer the surface becomes black and rough (the sexual spore-producing stage).
- Perithecia in mature fruiting bodies are more or less spherical and occur just below the body's surface.

== Distribution ==
Xylaria magnoliae mainly occurs in the southeastern USA, extending into the northern states where magnolia trees are planted. Reports of Xylaria magnoliae in China, on the basis of microscopic details, have proven to be a different species. It's unclear whether accounts from Mexico and Central America are this or similar fruit-inhabiting species. The species Xylaria jaliscoensis, known from Jalisco state in Mexico, also grows on magnolia fruits, but differs microscopically.

== Habitat ==
Xylaria magnoliae is highly specific to fruits of magnolia species.

== Conjectured life cycle ==
So far, the life cycle of Xylaria magnoliae is not well known, but features can be conjectured from studies of closely related, fruit-inhabiting species. Here are some incomplete observations considered likely as features of the species' life cycle:

- It is assumed that ascospores (sexual spores) mature late in the season, when fruits of host magnolias are maturing.
- The ascospores may be dispersed by wind to places where they give rise to conidia, which are asexual.
- Conidia are thought to be produced on seeds beneath trees at the same time that pollination occurs; conidia can infect flowers.
- It appears that Xylaria magnoliae finds its way onto decaying magnolia fruits by way of the magnolia tree's flowers.
- It is noted that conidial stromata (masses of fungal hyphae which can produce conidia) are always associated with decaying fruits and seeds while other debris appears uninvaded.
- It is further noted that members of the Xylariaceae have the propensity to establish "cryptic endophytic associations," which are complex relationships where a fungus inhabits a healthy plant's tissue without causing visible harm.

== Etymology ==
The genus name Xylaria is a New Latin construction based on the combining form xyl- from the Greek xylon, meaning "wood," with the Latin suffix arius, declined properly to -aria, having the general meaning "pertaining to." Thus, "pertaining to wood," wood being what most Xylaria species decompose.

The species name magnoliae clearly derives from the species living only on decaying magnolia fruits.
