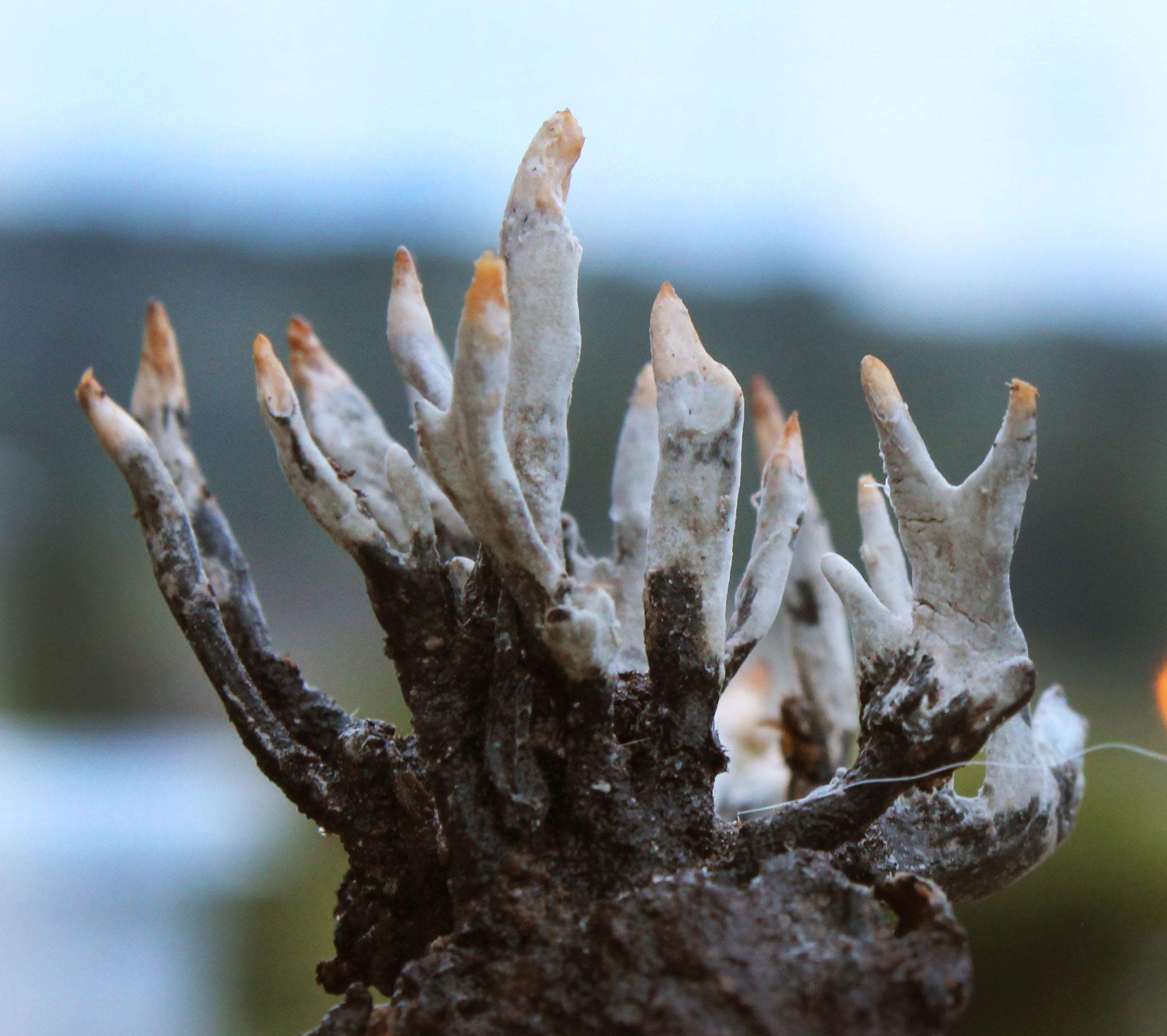
- Several Xylaria mali fungi growing at Montgomery, Alabama

Scientific classification
- Kingdom: Fungi
- Division: Ascomycota
- Class: Sordariomycetes
- Order: Xylariales
- Family: Xylariaceae
- Genus: Xylaria
- Species: X. mali

Binomial name
- Xylaria mali Fromme, (1928)

= Xylaria mali =

Species of fungus

Xylaria mali is a plant pathogen that causes black rot on apple.
