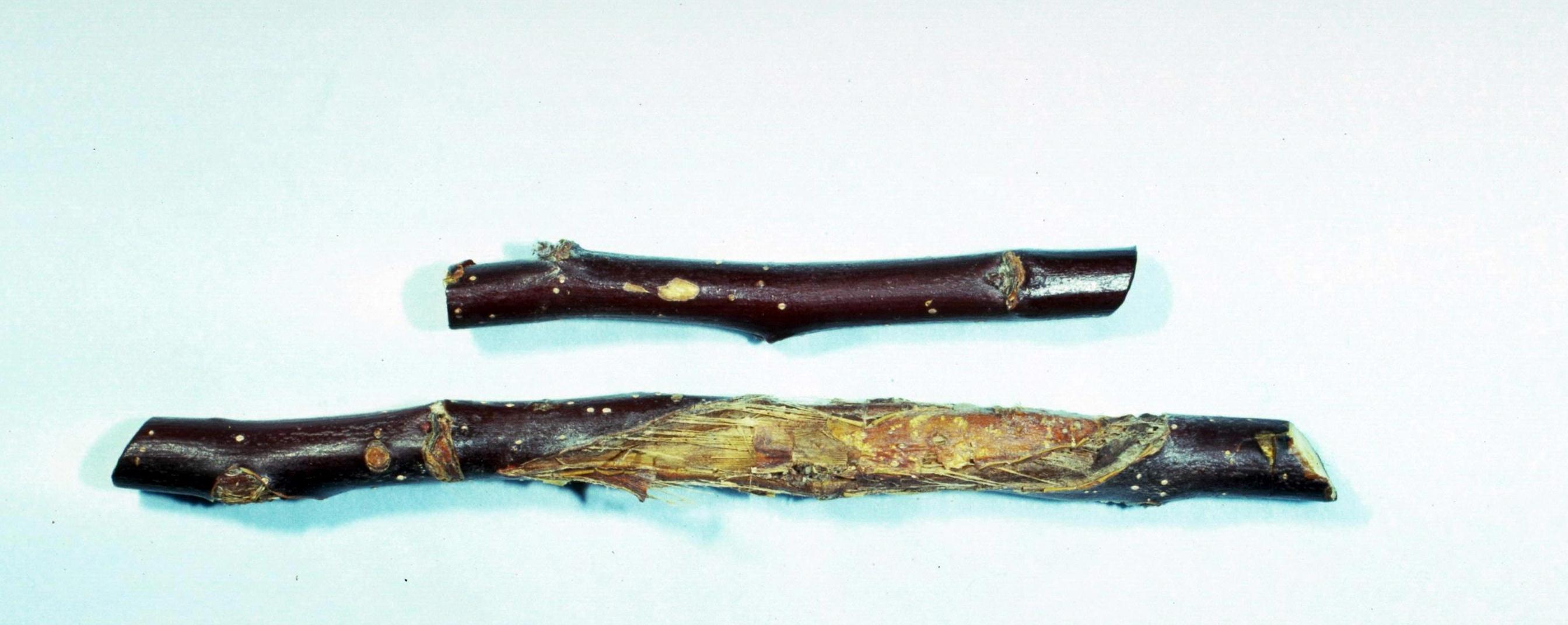
- Apple twigs with symptoms of bull's-eye rot infection caused by Neofabraea malicorticis. This disease is also sometimes referred to as the northwestern anthracnose canker. Image citation: H.J. Larsen, Bugwood.org

Scientific classification
- Domain: Eukaryota
- Kingdom: Fungi
- Division: Ascomycota
- Class: Leotiomycetes
- Order: Helotiales
- Family: Dermateaceae
- Genus: Neofabraea; H.S. Jacks.

Type species
- Neofabraea malicorticis H.S. Jacks.

= Neofabraea =

Genus of fungi

Neofabraea is a genus of fungi in the family Dermateaceae. The genus contains 12 species.

== Taxonomy ==
A morphological monograph of Neofabraea and the related Pezicula and their asexual states stimulated the description of many new species and a multigene phylogeny based on rDNA, RPB2 and TUB2 (beta-tubulin) sequences.

Many of the asexual states were formerly classified in the coelomycete genus Cryptosporiopsis.

== Morphology ==
Sexual states are often associated with cankers on bark, and are leathery black, brown, grey, or reddish apothecia about 1–2 mm diam. that usually lack a stipe, and have 8-spored cylindrical to club-shaped asci, often with an apical ring, and ellipsoidal to curved 1-celled, hyaline ascospores that sometimes germinate and produce conidia from phialides. Asexual states have stromatic coelomycetous conidiomata (which are often sporodochium-like when growing in agar culture) with slimy, cylindrical, ellipsoidal or fusiform 1-celled macroconidia and/or 1-celled cylindrical microconidia.

== Ecology and pathology ==
Most Neofabraeae species are temperate and associated with living trees; they often sporulate or make cankers on recently killed or fallen branches, or are isolated as endophytes from living branches or roots. Some species are weak bark, leaf or root pathogens.

Some Neofabraea species are serious plant pathogens in apple and pear orchards around the world that canker-bearing trees are usually removed. Neofabraea malicorticis, N. perennans and N. keinholzii cause apple anthracnose and post-harvest bull's eye rot. Bull's eye rot is somewhat amenable to control by fungicides, but effectiveness varies by species. Conventional and multiplex PCR assays for several species are available, derived from TUB2 (beta-tubulin) sequences.
