= Botryosphaeria stevensii =

Scientific classification
- Domain: Eukaryota
- Kingdom: Fungi
- Division: Ascomycota
- Class: Dothideomycetes
- Order: Botryosphaeriales
- Family: Botryosphaeriaceae
- Genus: Botryosphaeria
- Species: B. stevensii

Binomial name
- Botryosphaeria stevensii Shoemaker, (1964)

Synonyms
- List: Botryodiplodia malorum (Berk.) Petr. & Syd., Feddes Repert. Spec. Nov. Regni Veg., Beih. 42: 148 (1926); Botryosphaeria quercuum sensu Dingley; fide NZfungi (2008); Camarosporium mutilum (Fr.) Sacc. & Traverso, Syll. fung. (Abellini) 19: 219 (1910); Diplodia mutila (Fr.) Mont., Annls Sci. Nat., Bot., sér. 2 1: 302 (1834); Dothiora mutila (Fr.) P. Crouan & H. Crouan, Florule Finistère (Paris): 34 (1867); Dothiora mutila (Fr.) Fuckel, Jb. nassau. Ver. Naturk. 23-24: 275 (1870); Diplodia mutila var. major Wollenw. & Hochapfel, Centbl. Bakt. ParasitKde, Abt. II 12(2): 186 (1941); Diplodia quercina Westend., Bull. Acad. R. Sci. Belg., Cl. Sci., sér. 2 2(7): 560 (1857); Diplodia samararum Sacc., Mycotheca veneta: no. 1396 (1879); Hyalothyridium mutilum (Fr.) Sacc. & Trotter, Syll. fung. (Abellini) 22(2): 1085 (1913); Macrophoma malorum (Berk.) Berl. & Voglino, Atti Soc. Veneto-Trent. Sci. Nat. 10(1): 184 (1886); Macroplodia malorum (Berk.) Kuntze, Revis. gen. pl. (Leipzig) 3(3): 492 (1898); Metadiplodia mutila (Fr.) Zambett., Bull. trimest. Soc. mycol. Fr. 70(3): 284 (1955); Phoma malorum (Berk.) Sacc., Syll. fung. (Abellini) 3: 152 (1884); Physalospora mutila (Fr.) N.E. Stevens, Mycologia 28(4): 333 (1936); Sphaeria malorum Berk., in Smith, Engl. Fl., Fungi (Edn 2) (London) 5(2): 257 (1836); Sphaeria mutila Fr., Syst. mycol. (Lundae) 2(2): 424 (1823); Sphaeropsis malorum (Berk.) Berk., Outl. Brit. Fung. (London): 316 (1860); Sphaeropsis malorum f. caucasica Pestinsk., Sb. Vsesojuzn. Inst. Zašć. Rast. 3: 221 (1951); Sphaeropsis malorum f. ucrainica Pestinsk., Sb. Vsesojuzn. Inst. Zašć. Rast. 3: 221 (1951); Sphaeropsis malorum subsp. colorata Pestinsk., Sb. Vsesojuzn. Inst. Zašć. Rast. 3: 220 (1951); Sphaeropsis malorum subsp. hyalina Pestinsk., Sb. Vsesojuzn. Inst. Zašć. Rast. 3: 221 (1951)

Species of fungus

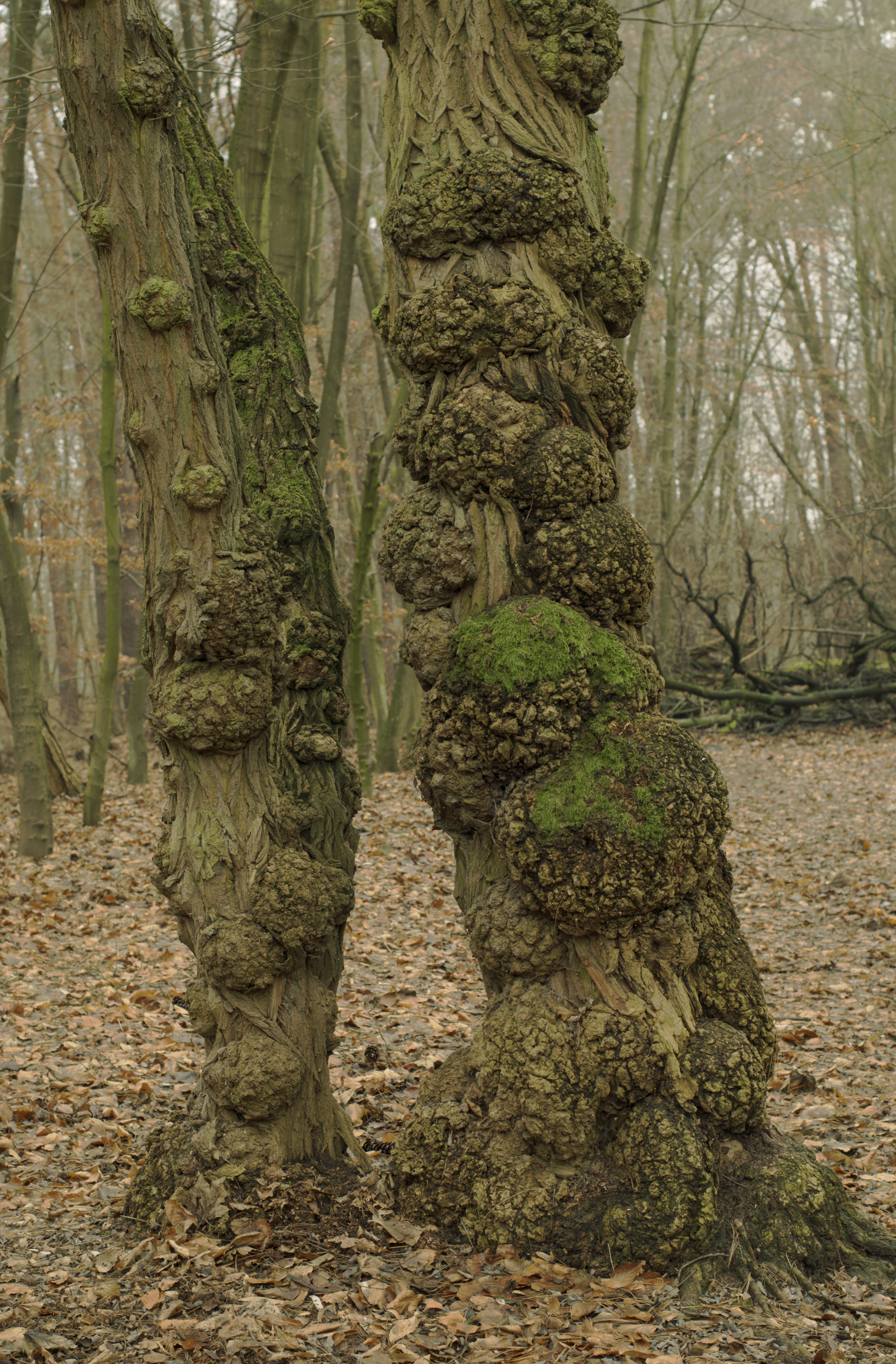
Black locusts with canker, presumably caused by Botryosphaeria stevensii

Botryosphaeria stevensii (Apple sphaeropsis) is a fungal plant pathogen that causes cankers on several tree species including apple and juniper as well as causing cankers on grape vines. It causes branch dieback, possibly affecting a large portion of the tree canopy, and if severe it can kill entire plants.

It was originally found on fallen fruit of Malus pumila in Great Britain and published and described by Berk as Sphaeropsis malorum in 1836 . With the epithet 'malorum' derived from the Latin for Apple. It is first seen as multiple very small, black pimples or pustules under the fruit skin before they break through the covering. Then a black conical protuberance appears, which is the spore-case of the fungus. Then a cluster of pale spores appears, on a short stem or pedicel. Later they turn black or black/brown and break off the pedicels. The spores then leave the spore-case by a small aperture at the top of the case. Infections can occur in winter or spring in the US.

Its anamorph was revealed to be Diplodia mutila.

It has been found on Rocky Mountain juniper (Juniperus scopulorum) in windbreak and ornamental plantings in the US. Multiple, coalescing cankers resulted in branch dieback and sometimes tree mortality. The fungus also was pathogenic to and caused canker formation on eastern redcedar (Juniperus virginiana) and Chinese juniper (Juniperus chinensis)

Prevention efforts may include careful selection of plants, including resistant cultivars, planting in well-draining loose soils, exposure to light and plant spacing to reduce moisture retention.
