= Phytophthora syringae =

Scientific classification
- Domain: Eukaryota
- Clade: Sar
- Clade: Stramenopiles
- Phylum: Oomycota
- Class: Peronosporomycetes
- Order: Peronosporales
- Family: Peronosporaceae
- Genus: Phytophthora
- Species: P. syringae

Binomial name
- Phytophthora syringae (Kleb.) Kleb., (1909)

Synonyms
- Nozemia syringae (Kleb.) Pethybr., (1913); Phloeophthora syringae Kleb., (1906)

Species of single-celled organism

Phytophthora syringae is an oomycete plant pathogen known to infect nursery plants, particularly apple and pear trees. It infects plants through wounded areas and is most pathogenic during cold, wet weather.
