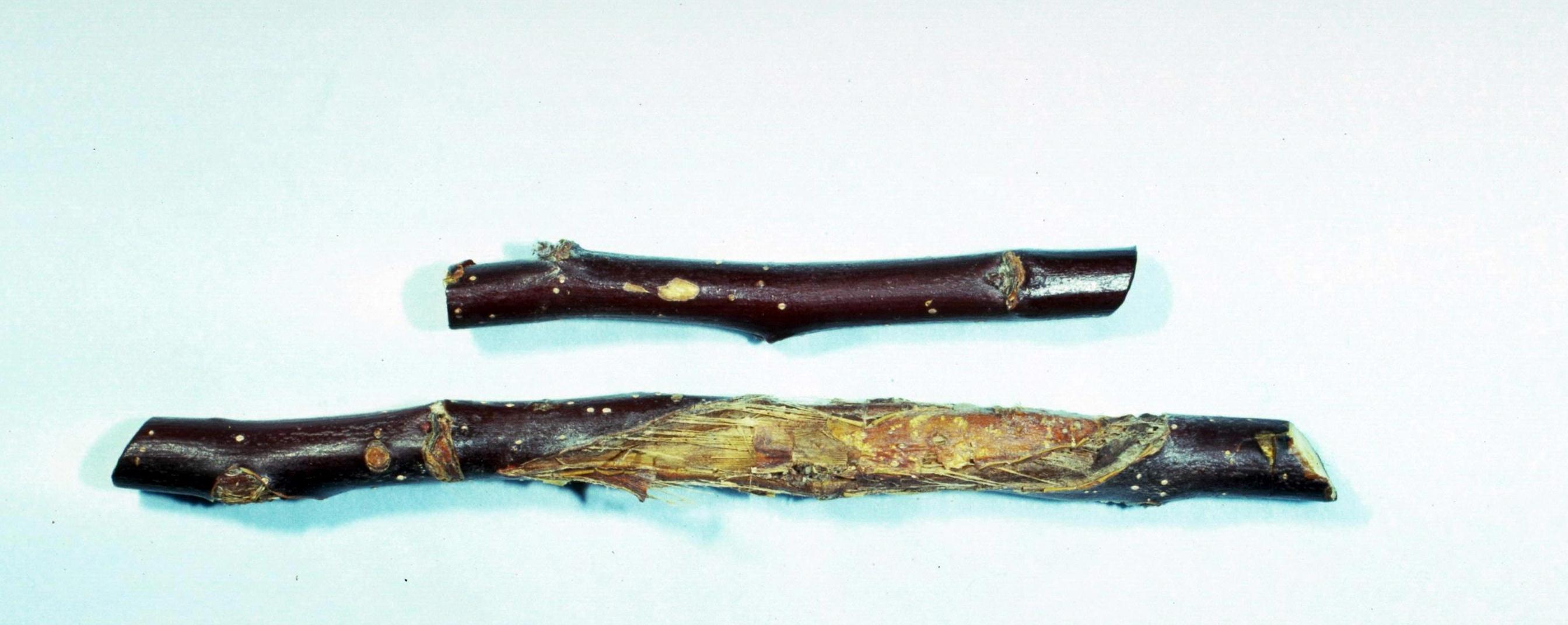
- Apple twigs with symptoms of bull's-eye rot infection caused by Neofabraea malicorticis

Scientific classification
- Kingdom: Fungi
- Division: Ascomycota
- Class: Leotiomycetes
- Order: Helotiales
- Family: Dermateaceae
- Genus: Neofabraea
- Species: N. malicorticis

Binomial name
- Neofabraea malicorticis H.S. Jacks., (1913)

Synonyms
- Cryptosporiopsis curvispora Cryptosporiopsis malicorticis Gloeosporium malicorticis Macrophoma curvispora Pezicula malicorticis

= Neofabraea malicorticis =

Species of fungus

Neofabraea malicorticis is a plant pathogen that causes bull's-eye rot on apples and pears.
