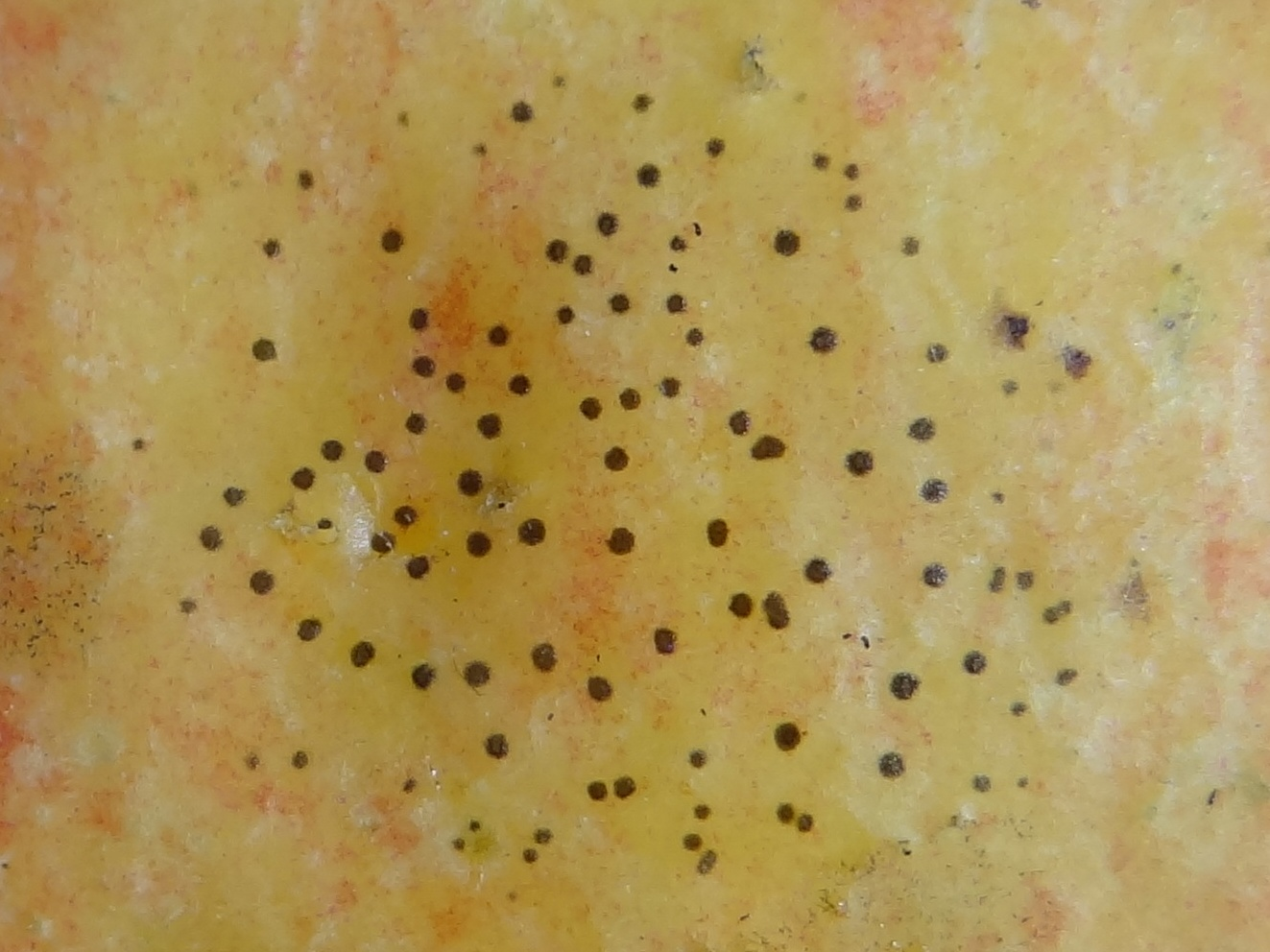

Scientific classification
- Kingdom: Fungi
- Division: Ascomycota
- Class: Dothideomycetes
- Order: Microthyriales
- Family: Schizothyriaceae
- Genus: Schizothyrium
- Species: S. pomi

Binomial name
- Schizothyrium pomi (Mont. & Fr.) Arx (1959)

Synonyms
- Botryodiplodia pomi Labrella pomi Leptothyrium pomi Microsticta pomi Microthyriella paludosa Microthyriella rubi Schizothyrina rubi Zygophiala jamaicensis

= Schizothyrium pomi =

Species of fungus

Schizothyrium pomi is a plant pathogen of the sooty blotch and flyspeck complex, infecting apple, pear and citrus trees and carnations.

As of 2008 it has been a presumed teleomorph of Zygophiala jamaicensis.
