= Leptodontidium trabinellum =

Scientific classification
- Kingdom: Fungi
- Division: Ascomycota
- Class: Leotiomycetes
- Order: Helotiales
- Family: Leptodontidiaceae
- Genus: Leptodontidium
- Species: L. trabinellum

Binomial name
- Leptodontidium trabinellum (P.Karst.) Baral, Platas & R.Galán (2015)

Synonyms
- List: Peziza trabinella P.Karst. (1869); Helotium trabinellum (P.Karst.) P.Karst. (1871); Calycina trabinella (P.Karst.) Kuntze (1898); Pachydisca trabinella (P.Karst.) Boud. (1907); Cistella trabinella (P.Karst.) Nannf. (1932); Phaeohelotium trabinellum (P.Karst.) Dennis (1971); Rhinocladiella elatior F.Mangenot (1952); Leptodontium elatius (F.Mangenot) de Hoog (1977); Leptodontidium elatius (F.Mangenot) de Hoog (1979); Leptodontium elatius var. ovalisporum de Hoog (1977); Leptodontidium elatius var. ovalisporum (de Hoog) de Hoog (1979)

Species of lichen

Leptodontidium trabinellum is a species of fungus in the family Leptodontidiaceae.
