= Peltaster fructicola =

Scientific classification
- Kingdom: Fungi
- Division: Ascomycota
- Class: Ascomycetes
- Order: incertae sedis
- Family: incertae sedis
- Genus: Peltaster
- Species: P. fructicola

Binomial name
- Peltaster fructicola Eric M. Johnson, T.B. Sutton & Hodges, (1996)

Species of fungus

Peltaster fructicola is an ascomycete fungus that is a plant pathogen of apples.
