= Geastrumia polystigmatis =

Scientific classification
- Kingdom: Fungi
- Division: Ascomycota
- Class: Ascomycetes
- Order: incertae sedis
- Family: incertae sedis
- Genus: Geastrumia
- Species: G. polystigmatis

Binomial name
- Geastrumia polystigmatis Bat. & M.L. Farr (1960)

Species of fungus

Geastrumia polystigmatis is an ascomycete fungus that is a plant pathogen.
