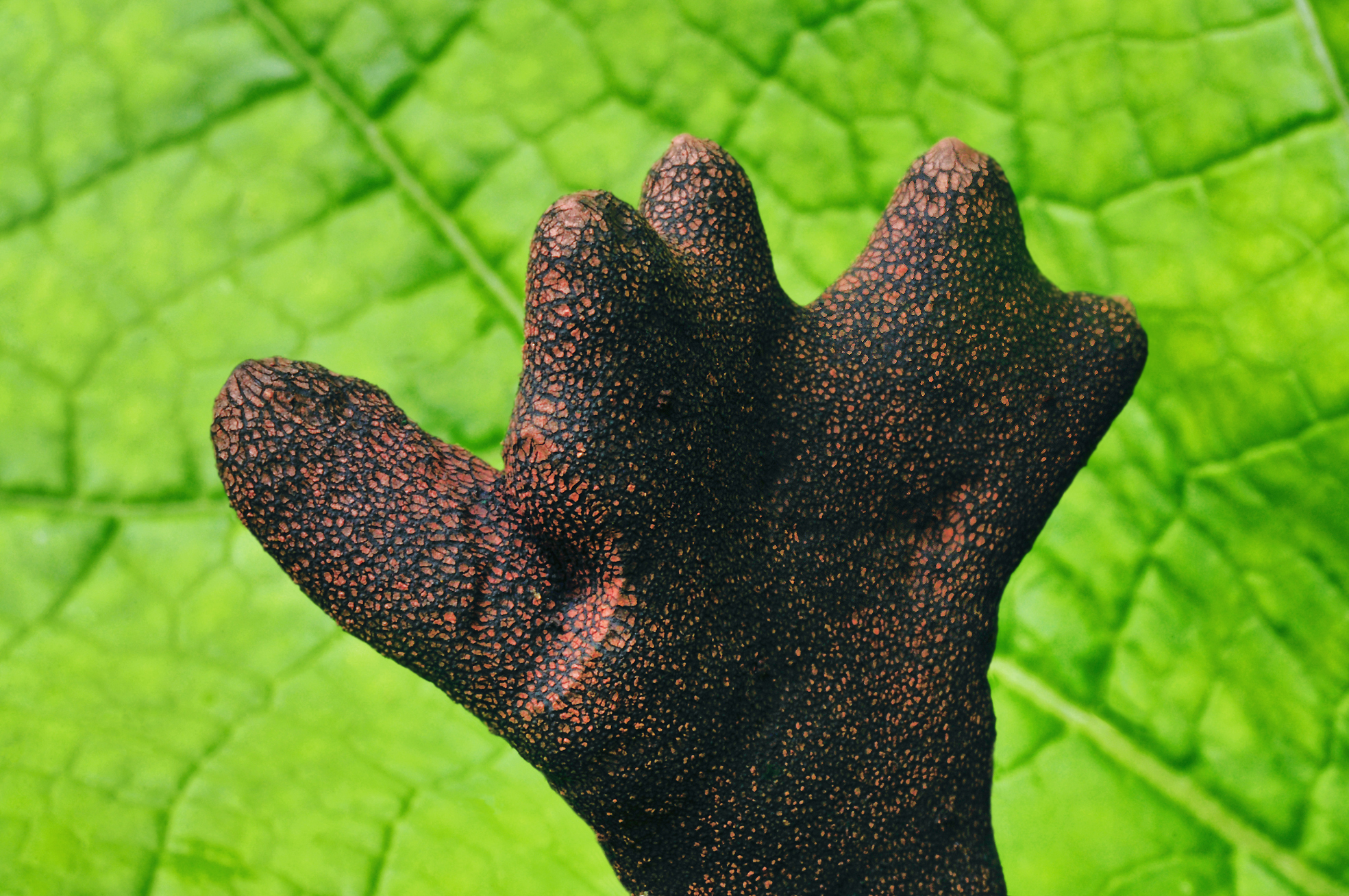

Scientific classification
- Kingdom: Fungi
- Division: Ascomycota
- Class: Sordariomycetes
- Order: Xylariales
- Family: Xylariaceae
- Genus: Xylaria
- Species: X. polymorpha

Binomial name
- Xylaria polymorpha (Pers.) Grev., (1824)

Synonyms
- Coelorhopalon obovatum Hypoxylon polymorphum Penzigia obovata Sphaeria obovatav Sphaeria polymorpha Xylaria corrugata Xylaria obovata Xylaria rugosa Xylosphaera obovata Xylosphaera polymorpha

= Xylaria polymorpha =

Species of fungus

Xylaria polymorpha
- Mycological characteristics
- Smooth hymenium
- Hymenium attachment is not applicable
- Stipe is bare
- Spore print is black to blackish-brown
- Ecology is saprotrophic
- Edibility is inedible

Xylaria polymorpha, commonly known as dead man's fingers, is a cosmopolitan saprobic fungus. It is characterized by its elongated upright, clavate, or strap-like stromata poking up through the ground, much like fingers.

== Taxonomy ==
The genus Xylaria contains about 100 species of cosmopolitan fungi. The specific epithet polymorpha means "many forms". As its name suggests, it has a variable but often club-shaped fruiting body (stroma) resembling burned wood.

== Description ==
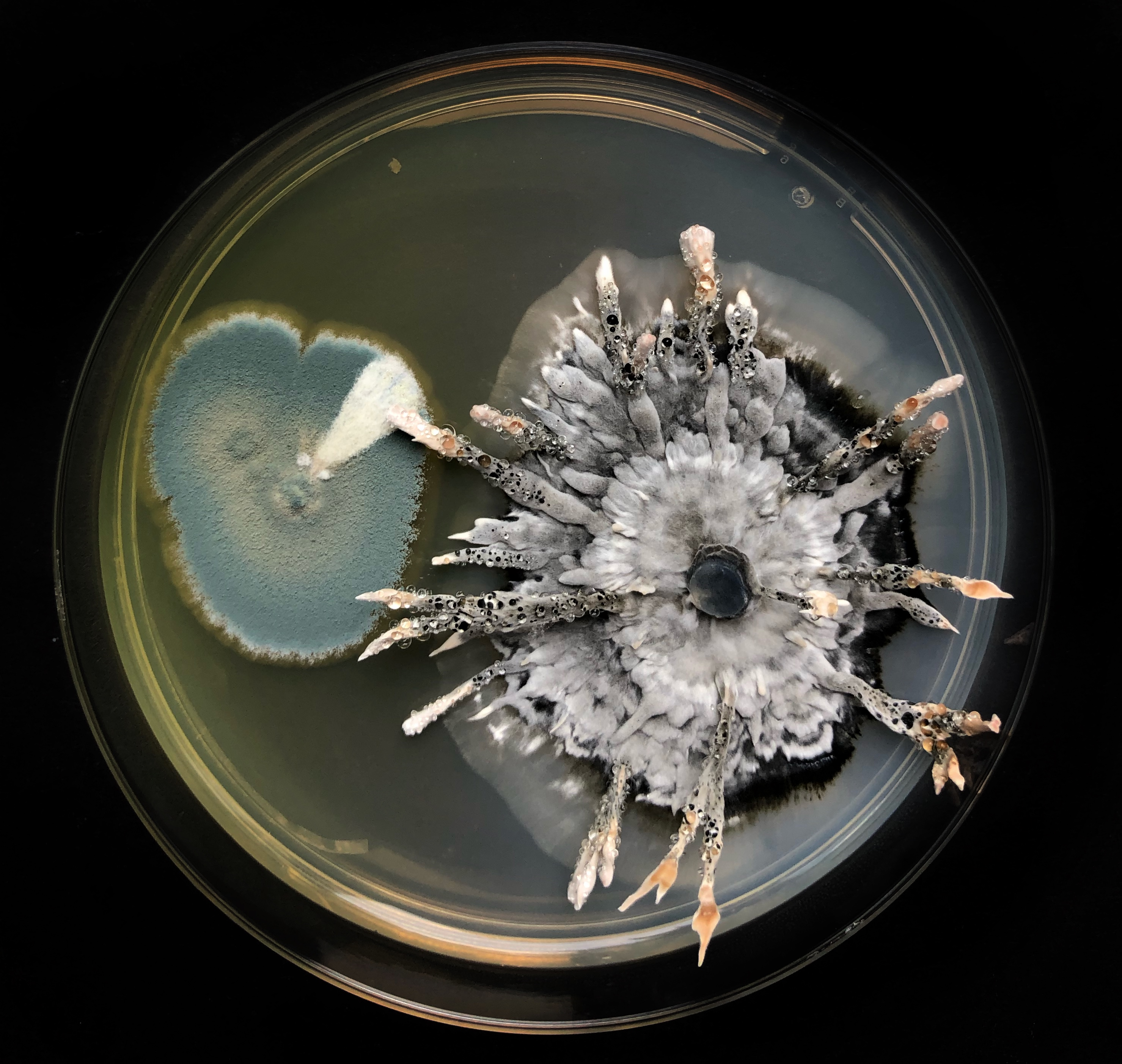
Xylaria polymorpha in Petri dish alongside Penicillium polonicum.

Belonging to the phylum of fungus known as Ascomycetes (division Mycota) known as the sac fungi, they are characterized by a saclike structure, the ascus, which contains anything from four to eight ascospores in the sexual stage. The sac fungi are separated into subgroups based on whether asci arise singly or are borne in one of several types of fruiting structures, or ascocarps, and on the method of discharge of the ascospores. Unlike some species in this class, X. polymorpha is inedible.

Often this fungus is found with a multitude of separate "digits", but at times the individual parts will be fused together. In maturity, the fruiting bodies can be 3–10 centimetres (1 1/4–4 inches) tall, externally colored black or brown, sometimes with shades of blue or green. It is white on the inside, with a blackened dotted area all around. This blackened surrounding area is made up of tiny structures called perithecia. The perithecia hold a layer of asci which contain the ascospores. The asci elongate into the ostiole, and discharge the ascospores outward. The spore distribution is a lengthy process, sometimes taking several months to complete. The spore print is black.

In springtime this fungus often produces a layer of white or bluish asexual spores called conidia, which grow on its surface and surrounding area.

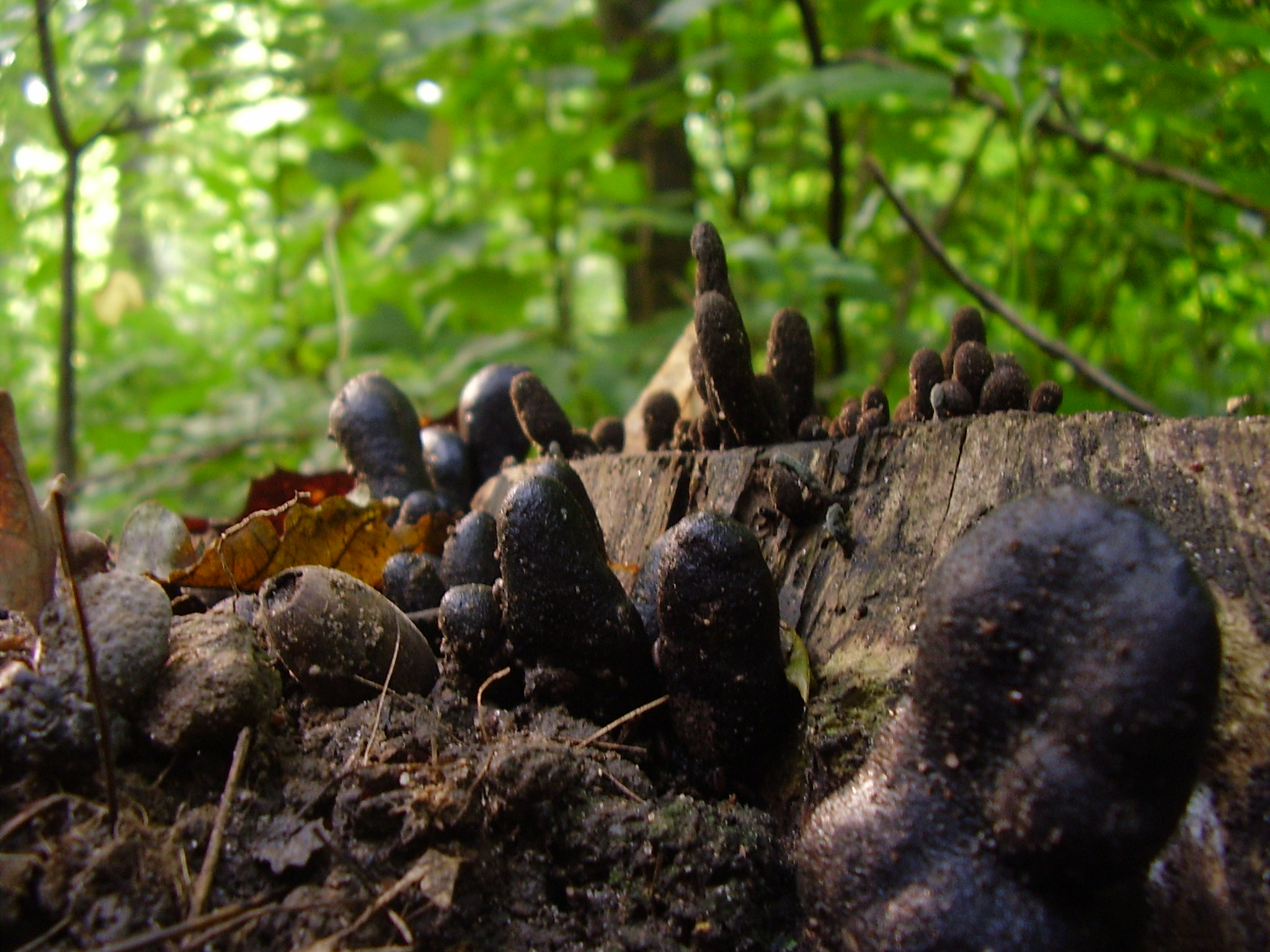
Xylaria polymorpha

== Distribution and habitat ==
X. polymorpha is geographically distributed across all six inhabited continents. It is a common inhabitant of forest and woodland areas, usually growing from the bases of rotting or injured tree stumps and decaying wood. It has also been known to colonize substrates like woody legume pods, petioles, and herbaceous stems.
