= Venturin =

Venturin is both a surname and a given name. Notable people with the name include:

- Giorgio Venturin (born 1968), Italian footballer
- Venturin Thrauison (fl. late 1500s), Slovenian politician

== See also ==
- Venturi (surname)
- Venturini, surname
