= Gustavo Venturi =

Italian bryologist (1830–1898)

Gustavo Venturi (4 February 1830, in Rovereto – 5 June 1898) was a bryologist from Austria-Hungary.

After graduating with a law degree, Venturi worked as an attorney in Trento, from where he researched bryology as a hobby. He was the author of 20 articles on the taxonomy of the moss genus Orthotrichum. In 1884, with Antonio Bottini, he published Enumerazione critica dei muschi italiani ("Enumeration of Italian mosses"). Shortly after his death, his treatise on bryophytes of Trentino, titled Le Muscinee del Trentino, was published. His herbarium is now kept at the Museo Tridentino di Scienze Naturali in Trento.

== Taxa ==
- Neoventuria (Syd. ex P. Syd., 1919).
- Venturia (Sacc., 1882).
