= Venturi (surname) =

Venturi is an Italian surname. Notable people with the surname include:

- Adolfo Venturi (1856–1941), Italian art historian
- Arcadio Venturi (1929–2025), Italian footballer
- Carlo Antonio Venturi (1805–1864), Italian mycologist
- Edgardo Venturi (born 1962), Italian rugby union player and sports director
- Emilie Ashurst Venturi (1821–1893), British artist, writer, and activist
- Federico Venturi (1940–2020), Italian paleontologist
- Franco Venturi (1914–1994), Italian historian, essayist and journalist
- Giacomo Venturi (born 1992), Italian footballer
- Giorgio Venturi (born 1966), Italian shot putter
- Giovanni Battista Venturi (1746–1822), Italian physicist
- Giovanni Host-Venturi, also known as "Nino" Host-Venturi (1892–1980), Italian fascist politician and historian
- Gustavo Venturi (1830–1898), Italian bryologist
- Ken Venturi (1931–2013), American professional golfer
- Lionello Venturi (1885–1961), Italian historian and critic of art
- Maurizio Venturi (born 1957), Italian football player and coach
- Mirko Venturi (born 1981), Italian racing driver
- Pietro Venturi, Italian lawyer and politician, Mayor of Rome (1875–77)
- Pietro Tacchi Venturi (1861–1956), Italian Roman Catholic Jesuit priest and historian, unofficial liaison between Benito Mussolini and popes Pius XI and Pius XII
- Remo Venturi (born 1927), Italian motorcycle racer
- Rick Venturi (born 1946), American football coach
- Robert Venturi (1925–2018), American architect
- Stefano Venturi del Nibbio (fl. 1592–1600), Italian composer of the late Renaissance, active in Venice and Florence
- Varo Venturi-Clementini (born 1956), Italian film director and musician

== Given name ==
- Venturi Salimbeni, or Ventura Salimebeni (1568–1613), Italian Counter-Maniera painter and printmaker

== Fictional characters ==
- Derek Venturi
- Edwin Venturi
- Marti Venturi
- George Venturi
