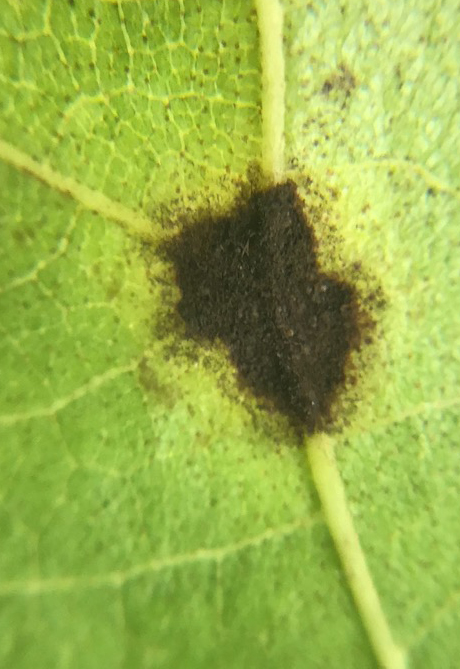

Scientific classification
- Domain: Eukaryota
- Kingdom: Fungi
- Division: Ascomycota
- Class: Dothideomycetes
- Order: Pleosporales
- Family: Venturiaceae
- Genus: Venturia
- Species: V. effusa

Binomial name
- Venturia effusa (G. Winter); Rossman & W.C. Allen

Synonyms
- Fusicladium effusum G. Winter; Fusicladium caryigenum Ellis & Langl.; Cladosporium effusum (G. Winter) Demaree; Fusicladosporium effusum (G. Winter) Partr. & Morgan-Jones

= Venturia effusa =

Species of fungus

Venturia effusa is a sexual species in the fungal genus Venturia. Venturia effusa was first described in 1885.

Venturia effusa is a fungal pathogen of pecan trees (Carya illinoinensis), on which it causes pecan scab. The fungus is highly pathogenic and causes substantial economic losses throughout the southeastern United States.

== Genome ==
The complete genome sequence of Venturia effusa, the first complete genome sequence of any species in the genus Venturia, was reported in 2019. The 45 Mb genome comprises 20 chromosomes, ranging from 0.56 to 4.1 Mb, including approximately 10,800 genes.
