= Venturiocistella =

Scientific classification
- Kingdom: Fungi
- Division: Ascomycota
- Class: Leotiomycetes
- Order: Helotiales
- Family: Hyphodiscaceae
- Genus: Venturiocistella; Raitv.

Type species
- Venturiocistella venturioides (Sacc. & Roum.) Raitv.

Genus of fungi

Venturiocistella is a genus of fungi within the family Hyphodiscaceae. The genus contained seven species (in 2008). Then 8 species in 2022.

The genus was circumscribed by Ain Gustavovich Raitviir in Sist. Rasprostranenie Gribov vol.155. 1978 (Acad. Sci. Eston. SSR) based on an earlier description in Syll. Fung. vol.8 on page 388 in 1889 by Pier Andrea Saccardo and Lars Romell (and named Pirottaea venturioides Sacc. & Romell.

The genus name of Venturiocistella is in honour of Carlo Antonio Maria Venturi (1805–1864), who was an Italian mycologist.

== Species ==
As accepted by Species Fungorum;

- Venturiocistella diversipila (Graddon) Baral (1993)
- Venturiocistella gaylussaciae Baral (1993)
- Venturiocistella heterotricha (Graddon) Baral (1993)
- Venturiocistella japonica Hosoya, Y. Harada & Y. Otani (1999)
- Venturiocistella pini (Höhn.) Baral (1993)
- Venturiocistella ulicicola (Graddon) Baral (1993)
- Venturiocistella uliginosa Raitv. (2004)
- Venturiocistella venturioides (Sacc. & Romell) Raitv. (1979)
