= Elliot Pecan =

Variety of tree

The Elliot Pecan, or Elliott Pecan, is a pecan variety planted predominantly in Georgia and Florida. The nut is distinguishable by its smooth shell and small, tear-drop shape. The first Elliot tree was a seedling in the lawn of the American lumberman Henry Elliot in Milton, Florida. The Elliot Pecan tree is among the most disease-resistant pecan trees planted in the Southeastern United States.

== History and characteristics ==
The original Elliot tree in Henry Elliot's lawn had a trunk diameter of 0.76 metres (2 ft 6 in) and was noted for its resistance to pecan scab and other diseases. The tree annually produced up to 114 kilograms (251 lb) of pecan nuts. In 1919, the Elliot family shared some of their pecans with Mr. Harlan of Harlan Farms Nursery in Paxton, Florida. Mr. Harlan was so impressed with the quality of the Elliot Pecan that he planted a 15-acre (6.1 ha) orchard of trees using bud wood that the Elliot family had given him. The orchard was then sold to Otis Mathis, whom the Florida Pecan Grower's Association credit with advancing the Elliot Pecan as an industry staple.

The Elliot Pecan is now among the most popular pecan varieties in the Southeastern United States. Growers prefer the variety because of its drought tolerance, high level of scab resistance, and consistent nut quality. The Elliot Pecan fetches a premium price from consumers due to the nut's attractive symmetry and exceptional flavor. It is often served with hors d’oeuvres at soirées and weddings. The buttery, hickory taste of the Elliot pecan also makes the nut a popular addition to specialty snacks and desserts, such as pecan pie.
