= Venturi =

Venturi may refer to:

- Venturi (surname)

== Technology ==
- Venturi tube
- Ejector venturi scrubber, a wet scrubber
- Venturi effect, a fluid or air flow effect
- Venturi mask, a medical device
- Venturi meter, a device for measuring the flow rate of fluids in a pipe
- Venturi pump, a pump using the venturi effect
- Venturi scrubber, gas stream scrubber
- Venturi Transport Protocol, transport layer protocol

== Companies ==
- Venturi (company), an electric car manufacturer

== Motorsport ==
- Venturi Racing, a team which competed in the FIA Formula E World Championship
- For the team that competed as Venturi in the 1992 Formula One season, see Larrousse
- See also: Venturini Motorsports, an American stock car team

== Places ==
- Venturi, the Provençal Occitan name for Montagne Sainte-Victoire
