= Venturini =

Venturini is a surname. Notable people with the surname include:

- Andrea Venturini (born 1996), Italian footballer
- Angela Venturini (born 1964), Dutch cricketer
- Atilije Venturini (1908–1944), Yugoslav swimmer
- Aurora Venturini (1922–2015), Argentine novelist, short story writer, poet, translator and essayist
- Bruno Venturini (1911–1991), Italian football goalkeeper
- Cláudio Venturini (born 1958), Brazilian guitarist, vocalist and composer
- Clément Venturini (born 1993), French cyclist
- Emilio Venturini (1878–1952), Italian operatic lyric tenor
- Fernanda Porto Venturini (born 1970), Brazilian former volleyball player
- Flávio Hugo Venturini (born 1949), Brazilian singer and songwriter
- Francesco Venturini (c. 1675–1745), Baroque composer
- Franco Venturini (rower) (born 1959), Italian rower
- Gaspare Venturini, Italian painter, active in Ferrara between 1576 and 1593
- Gian Carlo Venturini (born 1962), Captain Regent of San Marino in 1996–1997
- Giancarlo Venturini, Italian fashion designer and artist
- Giorgio Venturini (1906–1984), Italian film producer
- Giovanni Venturini (born 1991), Italian professional racing driver
- Giovanni Francesco Venturini (1650–1710), Roman Baroque engraver
- Jean Venturini (1919–1940), French surrealist poet
- Karl Heinrich Venturini (1768–1849), German theologian
- Marco Venturini (born 1960), Italian former sport shooter
- Marino Venturini (1944–2019), Captain Regent of San Marino
- Mark Venturini (1961–1996), American actor
- Roberto Venturini (born 1960), Captain Regent of San Marino in 2015, with Andrea Belluzzi
- Serge Venturini (born 1955), French poet
- Tisha Venturini (born 1973), American soccer player
- Wendy Venturini (born 1979), American TV motorsport presenter

== See also ==
- Venturini Motorsports
- Venturi (disambiguation)
- Palazzo Venturini, a palace located in central Parma, region of Emilia-Romagna, Italy
