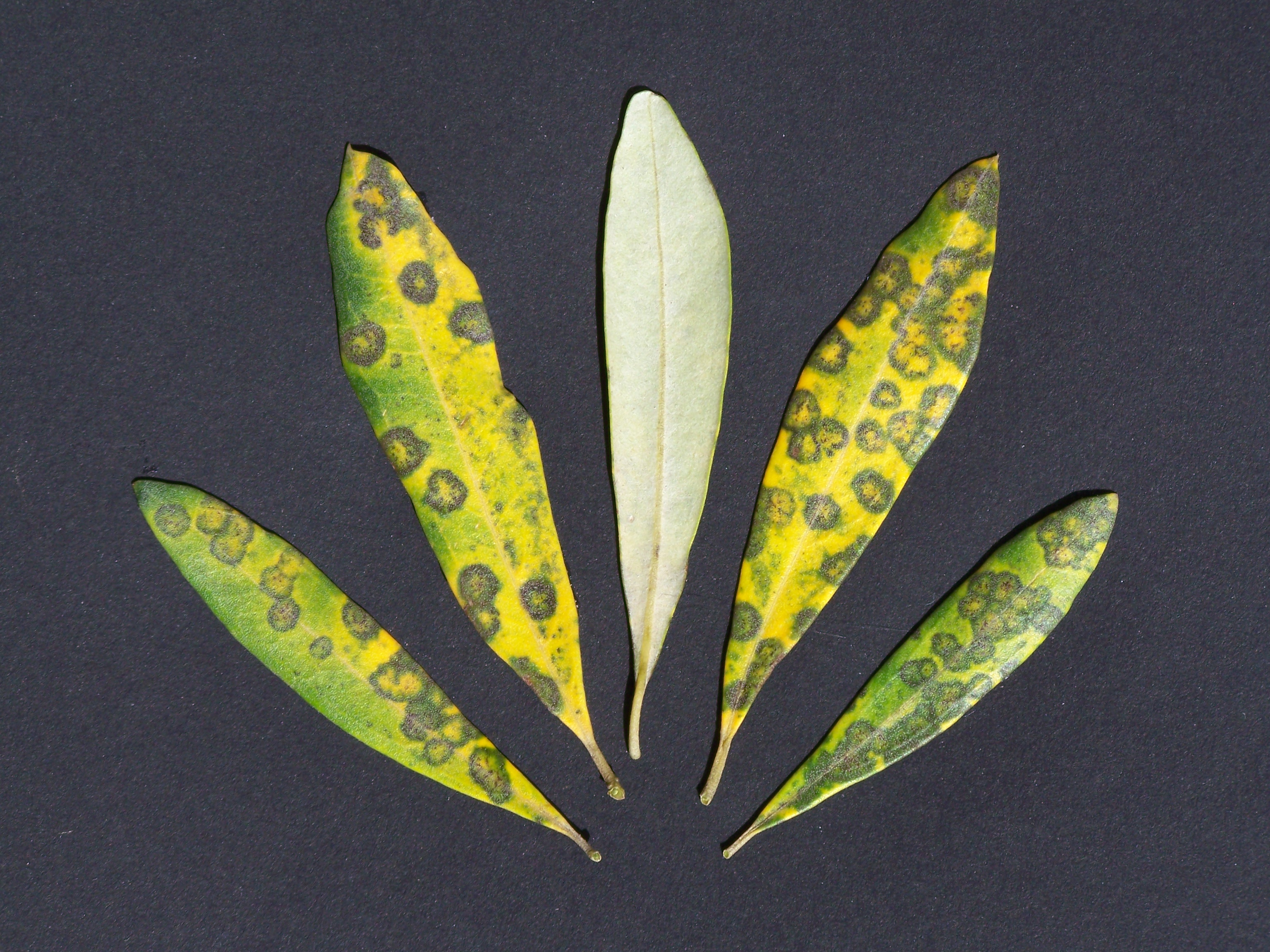

Scientific classification
- Kingdom: Fungi
- Division: Ascomycota
- Class: Dothideomycetes
- Order: Venturiales
- Family: Venturiaceae
- Genus: Venturia
- Species: V. oleaginea

Binomial name
- Venturia oleaginea (Castagne) Rossman & Crous

Synonyms
- Cycloconium oleagineum Castagne; Fusicladium oleagineum (Castagne) Ritschel & U. Braun; Spilocaea oleaginea (Castagne) S. Hughes; Cycloconium oleagineum var. quercus-ilicis Peglion; Cycloconium quercus-ilicis (Peglion) G. Arnaud

= Venturia oleaginea =

Species of fungus

Venturia oleaginea is a fungal plant pathogen, the cause of the disease peacock leaf spot, also known as olive peacock spot, olive leaf spot and bird's eye spot. This plant disease commonly affects the leaves of olive trees worldwide. The disease affects trees throughout the growing season and can cause significant losses in yield. The disease causes blemishes on the fruit, delays ripening, and reduces the yield of oil. Defoliation and in severe cases, twig death, can occur, and the disease can have long-term health effects on the trees.

== Hosts ==
Olive plants are the only known host of the pathogen, which is able to infect all olive cultivars, although different cultivars vary in their susceptibility. Young leaves are more likely to develop greater symptoms than intermediate or old leaves.

== Symptoms ==
In late spring, dark spots appear on the upper surface of leaf cuticles in the low canopy. These spots are lesions produced by the infecting fungus, and later are the site of sporulation. Symptoms may also appear on the stem and fruit, but are most common on the leaf surface. As the season progresses, the dark spots grow to a size of between 0.1 and 0.5 inches (0.25 and 1.27 cm) in diameter, with the emergence of a yellow halo around each spot. Plants may experience defoliation and in severe cases twig death. Blooms may also fail, resulting in significant reductions to crop production.

Cerocospora leaf spot may appear in tandem with the development of peacock spot, as grey or ashy fungus signs, due to conidia on the bottom of leaves.

== Disease cycle ==
The mycelium typically develops on the leaf tissue. Lesions can be seen on the upper surface of leaves. The reproductive spores of olive peacock spot that are known to exist are conidia. The disease is spread in several ways. The conidia can be spread by insects and the wind, and locally through rain water. The insect suspected of spreading olive peacock spot is Ectopsocus briggsi, which is in the same order as lice. Olive trees keep their leaves year round. The primary infection occurs in the fall. The mycelia in leaf lesions infect the surrounding tissue and produce conidia for the primary infection. Sporulation from the leaf lesions spreads the conidia to healthy plant tissue. Young leaves are more susceptible to infection than older leaves. Sporulation continues during the winter and into the spring. The pathogen goes dormant during the hot, dry summer and survives as mycelium. The mycelia go dormant inside lesions on living leaves. Leaves that have dropped to the ground have also been known to produce infection from lesions, but this is not usually a significant source of infection.

== Environment ==
Olive peacock spot disease is a worldwide agricultural problem and it thrives in similar conditions wherever it occurs. It depends on mild to low temperatures and free moisture to germinate and so it usually infects in the fall, winter, and spring. Hot and dry conditions in the summer cause the fungus to become inactivated and the leaf spots to turn white and crusted. During the summer, the diseased leaves fall leaving only the healthy ones on the partially defoliated trees. This provides a natural control for the disease. The disease also mainly infects young leaves in the spring.

The presence of free moisture on the leaves is crucial for the conidia to germinate. This can occur in as little as 9 hours in the optimum temperature range, and usually in no more than 24 hours. Without free moisture, the conidia will not germinate. The preferred temperature range is 58–75 °F (14–24 °C), however it can persist between 35–80 °F (2–27 °C).

Landscape can also affect the spread of olive peacock spot disease. It thrives in low-lying areas or in environments that receive little sunlight or have a closed tree canopy. Fog, dew, and high humidity are important factors. Under these conditions, this disease can spread even in summer.

Nutrient deficiencies or imbalances in the soil have been linked to increased susceptibility. An excess of nitrogen and a calcium deficiency may weaken an olive tree's defenses. However, attempts to fix this with foliar nutrients and compost tea have not proven effective.

== Management ==
Current practices in managing olive peacock spot disease aim for consistent suppression by keeping the levels of inoculum low through preventative measures. That is because there is no way to treat the disease once it appears in the spring or while the trees have fruit. The most common management approach is to spray the foliage with a copper compound after the fruit has been harvested in the fall, and again in the late winter if the environment is extremely wet. A power sprayer with high pressure is the most effective because it helps coat the entire surface of each leaf, even in the interior of the tree. If copper is sprayed on the fruit it is nearly impossible to wash away, so late harvests are often lost to infection. The spray comes in various forms of copper hydroxide, copper oxychloride, tribasic copper sulfate, and copper oxide. A few of those have been legally classified as organic.

There are other commercially available fungicides that don't contain copper, such as "Spotless", which is applied monthly as a foliar spray between harvesting and flowering.

No olive varieties are completely resistant to the fungus, but susceptibility varies among cultivars. Partially resistant varieties have been found to have genetic markers that can be used to select for resistant progeny. Information is usually listed in descriptions of varieties provided by the growers.

== Importance ==
Losses of 10 to 20 percent of fruiting wood have been observed in plants highly infected with olive peacock spot. While the disease is not highly detrimental, it can cause chronic problems and severe economic losses in some olive orchards. These losses are significant in an industry that occupies 8.5 million hectares.
