= Pecan scab =

Fungal disease of pecan trees

Pecan scab is the most economically significant disease of pecan trees (Carya illinoinensis) in the southeastern United States. Venturia effusa is a fungal plant pathogen that causes pecan scab. The fungus causes lesions and tissue death on pecan twigs, petioles, leaves, nuts and shucks beginning in early spring, with multiple cycles of infection repeating until late summer. Wind and rain spread the fungus to a susceptible host. Control of the disease is achieved by fungicide, sanitation and, in some cases, quarantine.

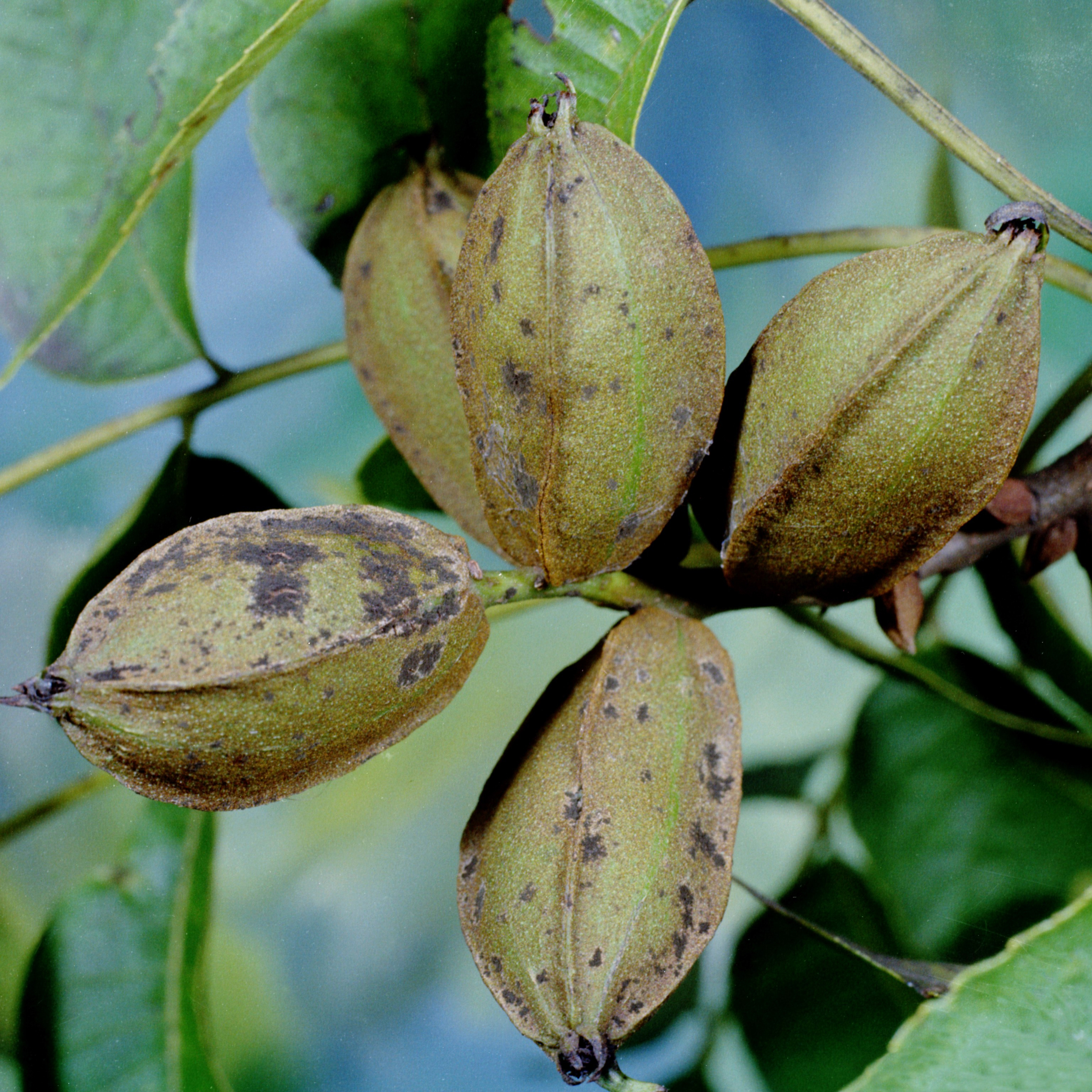
Pecan scab lesions caused by Venturia effusa on pecan husks

Since its first description in 1882, the pecan scab fungus has been reclassified ten times, with other names such as Fusicladium caryigenum, Cladosporium effusum and Cladosporium caryigenum commonly associated with the fungus.

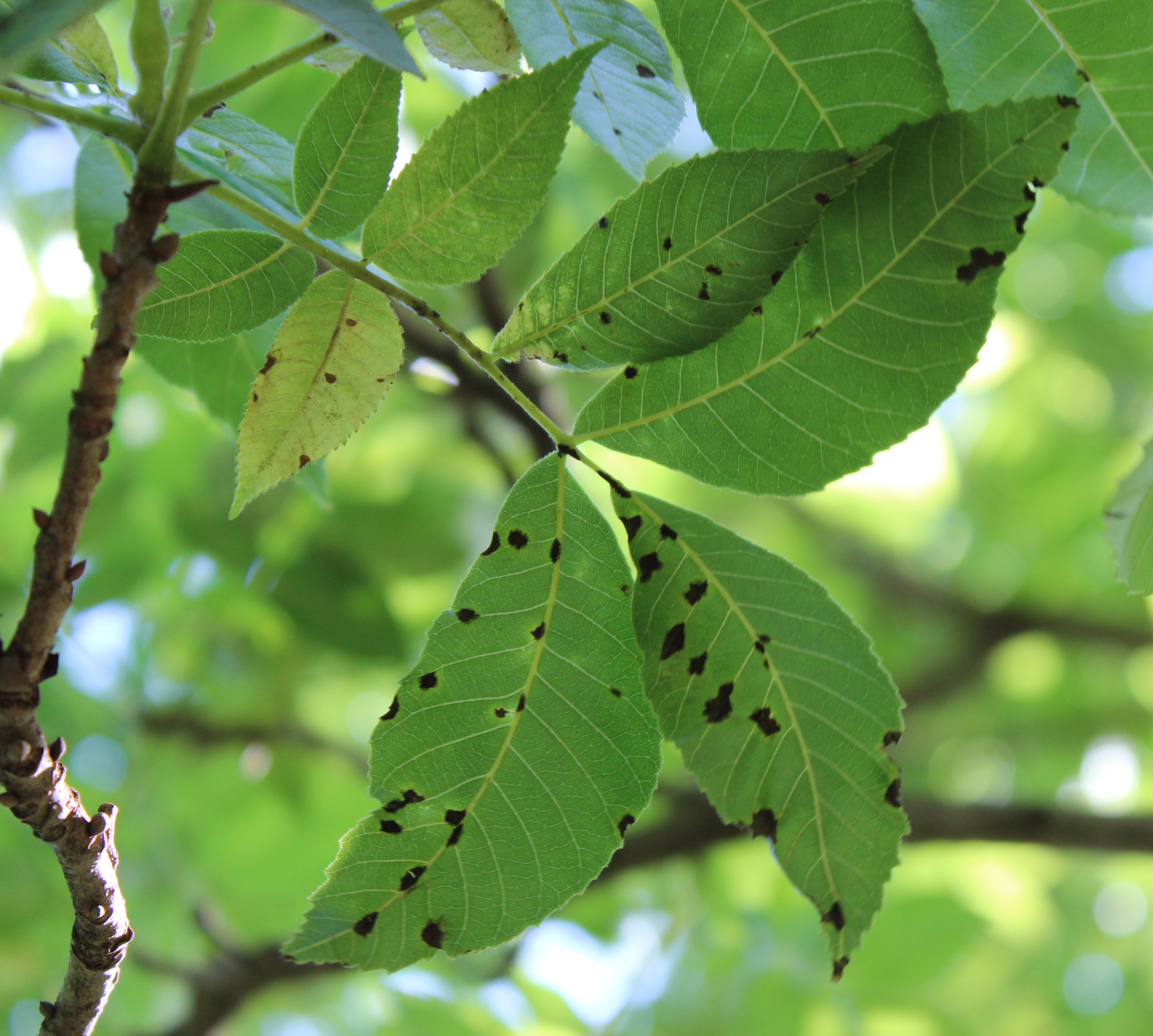
Pecan scab lesions caused by Venturia effusa on pecan leaves

== Host and symptoms ==
Venturia effusa has a narrow host range, and its most economically significant host is the pecan, Carya illinoinensis. The pathogen can also infect other trees in the genera Carya and Juglans (walnut). Common symptoms of pecan scab disease include light brown to black lesions on stems, leaves, shucks and nuts. Visible circular lesions begin to develop 7 to 14 days after infection, and first appear on young tissue as olive-green spots that turn black as they age. Older lesions may crack and fall out of the leaf-blade creating a shot-hole effect. Lesions range in diameter from a pinpoint to about one-quarter inch, and occur most numerously along leaf veins. Numerous lesions can coalesce into larger dead areas on infected tissue and can cause early leaf loss. Lesions on nuts may look sunken and distort nut morphology. They may also cause nuts to shrivel or drop prematurely. Lesions are amphigenous, meaning they grow on both sides of leaves.

== Disease cycle ==
Venturia effusa over-winters in plant debris, such as shucks, leaf petioles and stems, as well as in lesions on the tree from the previous season. It survives as stromata, a tight mat of fungal material that lives within tissue. In the spring time, hyphae in the stromata germinate to produce solitary or loosely fasciculate conidiophores which produce conidia (asexual spores) in simple or branched chains. Conidia are dentical-like and have unthickened walls. Conidia are moved by wind and water to a susceptible host, but they cannot germinate and infect without several hours of sustained wet weather. Afternoon rain storms and wet conditions overnight provide ideal conditions for germination. Conidia germinate and form germ tubes which enter the host through stomata or through the cuticle, before forming intramatrical mycelia which moves through the plant and establishes the new infection. These mycelia give rise to further conidiophores and conidia, allowing for many infection cycles in each season.

Venturia effusa commonly reproduces asexually via conidia, but it may also produce a teleomorph stage like other Dothideomycetes in which pseudothecia carrying asci and sexual ascospores grow out of the hyphae. This allows for sexual reproduction and genetic recombination of the pathogen. The teleomorph stage, however, is very rare and literature on its characteristics are lacking.

The severity of infection depends in part on the timing of inoculation. A study by Gottwald and Bertrand in 1982 found that trees inoculated after late June, when the endocarp (shell) begins to form, suffered much less damage to nuts than those inoculated in May or early June during nut set. Trees in the latter category experienced the greatest disease severity around mid-season (mid-July through August), roughly 1.5 to 2 months after inoculation.

== Environment ==
A conducive environment for the propagation of pecan scab requires wet weather. For the spores to inoculate the host, there must be a period of wet weather in order for the infection to occur. The amount of rainfall is not as important as the frequency of rainfall and length of time that the leaves and fruit stay wet. For example, the optimal time for a rain would be right before dusk because the plant will stay wet overnight, thus increasing the period of time the pathogen has to infect the plant. The temperature is not as critical of a factor in the environment. The pathogen thrives in adequate temperatures of spring and summer ranging from 20–30 °C (68–86 °F). When there is a pecan orchard, cultural practices that increase the humidity levels also provide a good environment for the pathogen. These practices include close tree spacing, low limbs, and dense ground vegetation.

== Management ==
Although resistant varieties of pecan trees are available, such as the Elliot Pecan tree, historically the pathogen has overcome the resistance due to its ability to quickly change over time. Because resistance has been ineffective, the main control of the pathogen is fungicide application for commercial farming. Some commercial fungicides used are Pristine, Sovran, Quash, and Headline SC. For the fungicides to be effective, they must be sprayed before inoculation/infection period. The exact time for the first spray depends on the chemical used, but an example time periods is when the buds are bursting and the first leaves begin to show. The fungicide should be sprayed sufficiently in order to completely cover the tree. The rates per acre of application range from 2–5 fluid ounces on developing trees to 8–12 fluid ounces on mature trees. They are protectant fungicides, meaning that they work best to prevent disease from happening when sprayed before any disease is detected. The idea of "getting ahead" of the pathogen is key to preventing a large loss of production.

After this initial spray, the plant tissue is still susceptible to infection making it necessary for multiple sprays to occur during a growing season. The number of applications during a season depends on the weather, amount and virulence of the pathogen, and susceptibility of the cultivars. Generally, the cultivars are sprayed about every two to four weeks of its growing season in spring and summer. This ends up being about 5–7 sprays per growing season. The fungicide needs to be sprayed in a concentration high enough to prevent infection and to completely cover the trees. The fungicides have not been shown to have any adverse effects outside of the warnings of all chemical control impacts on environmental and human health.

Although fungicide application is effective in the commercial setting, the cost of the chemicals and equipment is usually not practical for noncommercial farming such as orchards and small farms. In the noncommercial case, good sanitation practices may help prevent the disease. Removal and destruction of all fallen leaves, shucks, and nuts each winter or early spring helps reduce tissue that is often involved in the primary infection. Also, selective pruning of infected tissue during the dormant season may help reduce the level of scab disease.

A recent study has been done to test if phosphite, a chemical with the potential to induce systemically acquired resistance (SAR), could be used as a potential control for pecan scab. The results showed that in the early stages of the growing season, phosphite was comparable to current fungicide control, however may not be as effective in providing elongated protection in the later growing season.

== Importance ==
Pecan scab disease is the most economically damaging disease of pecans in the Southeastern United States, which is one of the major pecan producing regions in the world. It infects the leaves, shucks, and nuts thus reducing crop yield. In addition, the cost of fungicide application reduces the profitability of pecan production. Because of the cost of fungicides, pecan scab also prevents small orchards and yard trees from producing high quality nuts. The average cost of pecans ranges from $2.86–$3.50 per pound. Prices may fluctuate slightly with demand. An average tree will yield 40–50 pounds of nuts, thus equating to roughly $135 per tree. At 27 trees/acre, the total profit would be $3,645 per acre. Pecan scab is a devastating disease that can significantly impact the amount of quality pecans produced in a year. For example, during the summer of 2013, the estimated potential for the year was around 90 million pounds; however, the weather conditions were conducive for pecan scab growth and the actual total went down to 65 to 70 million. Pecans are valuable crops that are economically valuable to the farmer and also the farming industry. Devastating diseases like pecan scab can result in major financial loss that can hurt growers and also economic development.
