= Neoventuria =

Scientific classification
- Kingdom: Fungi
- Division: Ascomycota
- Class: Dothideomycetes
- Subclass: incertae sedis
- Genus: Neoventuria; Syd. & P.Syd. (1919)

Type species
- Neoventuria argentinensis (Speg.) Syd. & P.Syd. (1919)

Genus of fungi

Neoventuria is a genus of fungi in the class Dothideomycetes. The relationship of this taxon to other taxa within the class is unknown (incertae sedis). A monotypic genus, it contains the single species Neoventuria argentinensis.

The genus was circumscribed by Hans Sydow and Paul Sydow in Ann. Mycol. vol.17 on page 44 in 1919.

The genus name of Neoventuria is in honour of Carlo Antonio Maria Venturi (1805–1864), who was an Italian mycologist.

== See also ==
- List of Dothideomycetes genera incertae sedis
