= Carlo Antonio Venturi =

Italian mycologist (1806–1864)

Carlo Antonio Maria Venturi (Brescia, 11 October 1805 – 1864) was an Italian mycologist. In 1842 he published Mycological Studies, in which he described sixty-two species of fungi. In 1845 he published miceti dell'agro bresciano descritti ed illustrati con figure tratte dal vero.

In 1882, Pier Andrea Saccardo published Venturia, which is a genus of fungi in the family Venturiaceae and it was named in Venturi's honour. Then in 1919, Hans Sydow and Paul Sydow circumscribed Neoventuria, which is a genus of fungi in the class Dothideomycetes. Lastly, in 1978, Venturiocistella (Sacc. & Romell) Raitv. 1978 another genus of fungi (in Hyphodiscaceae family).
