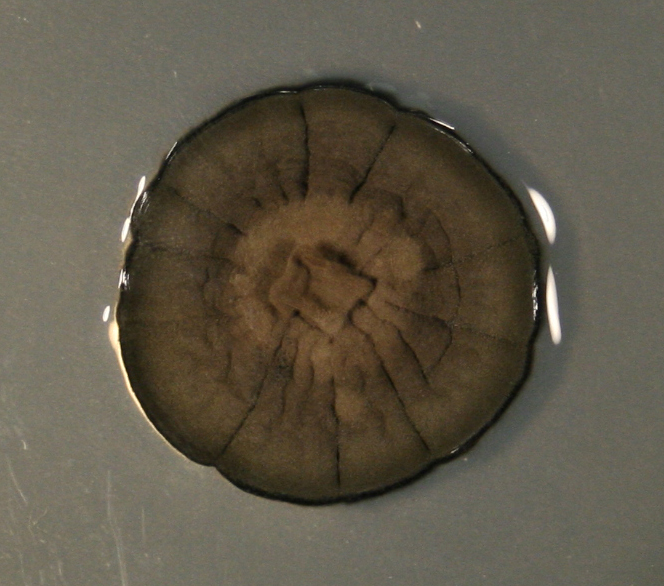
- Venturia effusa

Scientific classification
- Kingdom: Fungi
- Division: Ascomycota
- Class: Dothideomycetes
- Order: Venturiales
- Family: Venturiaceae
- Genus: Venturia; Sacc. (1882)

Type species
- Venturia inaequalis (Cooke) G.Winter (1897)

Species
- 58

Synonyms
- Asterina sect. Asterula Sacc. (1882); Asterula (Sacc.) Sacc. (1891); Endostigme Syd. (1923); Actinodothidopsis F.Stevens (1925); Phasya Syd. (1934); Endocoleroa Petr. (1969)

= Venturia (fungus) =

Genus of fungi

Venturia is a genus of fungi in the family Venturiaceae. First identified in 1882, species in the genus are plant pathogens. Venturia is widespread and the genus contains an estimated 58 species, or 130 species. Anamorphs were historically represented in the genus Fusicladium.

The genus was circumscribed by Pier Andrea Saccardo in Syll. Fung. vol.1 on page 586 in 1882.

The genus name of Venturia is in honour of Carlo Antonio Maria Venturi (1805–1864), who was an Italian mycologist.

== Species ==
As accepted by Species Fungorum;

- Venturia acerina Plakidas ex M.E. Barr (1968)
- Venturia aceris (Höhn.) Sivan. (1977)
- Venturia achilleae Sivan. (1977)
- Venturia adusta (Fuckel) E. Müll. (1958)
- Venturia aesculi (Syd.) Sivan. (1977)
- Venturia alaskensis M.E. Barr (1968)
- Venturia allii Ade & Rehm (1923)
- Venturia alnea (Fr.) E. Müll. (1958)
- Venturia anemones E. Müll. (1955)
- Venturia antherici Hollós (1910)
- Venturia asperata Samuels & Sivan. (1975)
- Venturia atriseda Rehm (1882)
- Venturia aucupariae (Plowr.) Rostr. (1902)
- Venturia austrogermanica Rehm (1906)
- Venturia betulina Mouton (1900)
- Venturia bistortae (Syd.) Sivan. (1977)
- Venturia borealis A. Funk (1989)
- Venturia borgiana Sacc. (1915)
- Venturia braunii Volkart (1912)
- Venturia canadensis M.E. Barr (1968)
- Venturia carpophila E.E. Fisher (1961)
- Venturia castaneae Kleb. (1934)
- Venturia catenospora (Butin) Rossman & Crous (2015)
- Venturia centaureae Arx (1950)
- Venturia cephalariae (Auersw.) Kalchbr. & Cooke (1880)
- Venturia cerasi Aderh. (1900)
- Venturia chamaemori (P. Karst.) Arx (1957)
- Venturia chamaepeuces Petr. (1992)
- Venturia chartae Vouaux (1912)
- Venturia chinensis Y. Zhang ter & Jia Q. Zhang (2015)
- Venturia chlorospora (Ces.) P. Karst. (1873)
- Venturia chrysanthemi E. Müll. (1955)
- Venturia comari (J. Schröt.) E. Müll. (1962)
- Venturia convolvulorum (Ondřej) Rossman & Crous (2015)
- Venturia coprosmae (F. Stevens) E. Müll. (1962)
- Venturia corni E. Müll. (1958)
- Venturia corralensis Speg. (1910)
- Venturia crataegi Aderh. (1902)
- Venturia deutziae Feltgen (1903)
- Venturia ditricha (Fr.) P. Karst. (1873)
- Venturia effusa (G. Winter) Rossman & W.C. Allen (2016)
- Venturia elaeidis Marchal & Steyaert (1929)
- Venturia elasticae (Koord.) Sacc. & Traverso (1911)
- Venturia emergens Petch (1917)
- Venturia ephedrae Cruchet (1923)
- Venturia epilobii (Desm.) Höhn. (1918)
- Venturia eres (Berk. & Broome) Ces. & De Not. (1863)
- Venturia euchaeta Penz. & Sacc. (1902)
- Venturia fagi M.E. Barr (1968)
- Venturia frangulae Krieg. (1909)
- Venturia fuliginosa Y. Zhang ter & J.Q. Zhang (2016)
- Venturia geranii (Fr.) G. Winter (1885)
- Venturia glacialis Lar.N. Vassiljeva (1987)
- Venturia haglundii (Starbäck) Sacc. (1891)
- Venturia hariotiana Speg. (1908)
- Venturia helvetica Nüesch (1960)
- Venturia inaequalis (Cooke) G. Winter (1875)
- Venturia inopina G. Newc. (2003)
- Venturia integra Cooke (1871)
- Venturia iridis Gonz. Frag. & Cif. (1926)
- Venturia juncaginearum (Lasch) M.E. Barr (1968)
- Venturia kunzei Sacc. (1882)
- Venturia laneae Dearn. (1926)
- Venturia liriodendri Hanlin (1987)
- Venturia litseae Syd. & P. Syd. (1913)
- Venturia lonicerae Sacc. (1882)
- Venturia lycopodii L. Holm & K. Holm (1981)
- Venturia macularis (Fr.) E. Müll. & Arx (1950)
- Venturia maculicola Schembel (1913)
- Venturia maculiformis (Desm.) G. Winter (1885)
- Venturia major (Auersw.) M. Morelet (1975)
- Venturia mandshurica M. Morelet (1993)
- Venturia martianoffiana (Thüm.) Y. Zhang ter & J.Q. Zhang (2017)
- Venturia massalongoi (Traverso) Bachm. (1963)
- Venturia minuta M.E. Barr (1968)
- Venturia minutissima Bat. & Peres (1960)
- Venturia missionum Speg. (1908)
- Venturia moreletii Rulamort (1986)
- Venturia muelleri R. Menon (1956)
- Venturia nashicola S. Tanaka & S. Yamam. (1964)
- Venturia naumoviella Negru (1961)
- Venturia nebulosa Ellis & Everh. (1902)
- Venturia nitida (Petr.) E. Müll. (1962)
- Venturia oleaginea (Castagne) Rossman & Crous (2015)
- Venturia orbicularis (Peck) M. Morelet (1977)
- Venturia orbiculata (Desm.) U. Braun (2019)
- Venturia palustris Sacc., E. Bommer & M. Rousseau (1886)
- Venturia paralias G.C. Hunter, I. Zeil-Rolfe, M. Jourdan & L. Morin (2020)
- Venturia peltigericola (Crous & Diederich) Crous, M. Shen & Y. Zhang ter (2020)
- Venturia phaeosepta Y. Zhang ter & J.Q. Zhang (2017)
- Venturia phillyreae (Nicolas & Aggéry) Rossman & Crous (2015)
- Venturia polygoni-vivipari Arx (1950)
- Venturia populina (Vuill.) Fabric. (1902)
- Venturia potentillae (Fr.) Cooke (1877)
- Venturia pruni M.E. Barr (1968)
- Venturia pruni-cerasi (Sacc.) R. Menon (1956)
- Venturia pyrina Aderh. (1896)
- Venturia radiosa (Lib.) Ferd. & C.A. Jørg. (1938)
- Venturia rhamni (Bonar) M.E. Barr (1968)
- Venturia ribis Sivan. (1985)
- Venturia rubicola Ellis & Everh. (1902)
- Venturia rumicis (Desm.) G. Winter (1885)
- Venturia saliciperda Nüesch (1960)
- Venturia spiraeicola U. Braun & Melnik (1996)
- Venturia stevensii (Syd.) E. Müll. (1962)
- Venturia subcutanea Dearn. (1917)
- Venturia submersa Iturrieta-González, Gené & Dania García (2019)
- Venturia syringae (Syd.) M.E. Barr (1968)
- Venturia syringina Kirschst. (1941)
- Venturia thwaitesii Massee & Crossl. (1904)
- Venturia tomentosae R. Menon (1956)
- Venturia tremulae Aderh. (1897)
- Venturia tucumanensis Speg. (1898)
- Venturia uliginosi (B. Erikss.) Lar.N. Vassiljeva (1987)
- Venturia ulmi E. Müll. (1958)
- Venturia usteriana Speg. (1908)
- Venturia variisetosa (M.E. Barr) Lar.N. Vassiljeva (1987)
- Venturia viennotii M. Morelet (1977)
- Venturia weiriana (Petr.) M.E. Barr (1968)

== Former species ==
As accepted by Species Fungorum;

- V. aggregata G. Winter (1884) = Antennularia aggregata, Metacapnodiaceae
- V. alchemillae (Grev.) Berk. & Broome (1875) = Coleroa alchemillae
- V. alpina Sacc. (1875) = Protoventuria alpina, Metacapnodiaceae
- V. alpina Niessl (1881) = Gibbera niesslii
- V. andicola Speg. (1912) = Niesslia andicola, Niessliaceae
- V. antarctica Speg. (1887) = Niesslia antarctica, Niessliaceae
- V. antherici var. gentianae O. Hilber & R. Hilber (1986) = Venturia antherici
- V. applanata Ellis & G. Martin (1884) = Chaetothyrina applanata, Micropeltidaceae
- V. asterinoides Ellis & G. Martin (1892) = Chaetothyrina asterinoides, Micropeltidaceae
- V. asteromorpha (Lib.) E. Müll. (1958) = Venturia epilobii
- V. atramentaria Cooke (1873) = Gibbera conferta
- V. barbula (Berk. & Broome) Cooke (1871) = Trichosphaeria barbula, Trichosphaeriaceae
- V. barriae Rossman & Crous (2015) = Fagicola fagi
- V. bellotae Speg. (1910) = Niesslia bellotae, Niessliaceae
- V. bryophila (Fuckel) Sacc. (1881) = Epibryon bryophilum, Epibryaceae
- V. cassandrae Peck (1885) = Gibbera cassandrae
- V. caulicola Rostr. (1903) = Coleroa caulicola
- V. chaetomium Ces. & De Not. (1863) = Niesslia exosporioides, Niessliaceae
- V. chlorospora f. pruni-cerasi Sacc. (1882) = Venturia pruni-cerasi
- V. chlorospora var. canescens P. Karst. (1873) = Venturia chlorospora
- V. chlorospora var. microspora Sacc. (1882) = Venturia chlorospora
- V. chlorospora var. pyri Sacc. (1882) = Venturia chlorospora
- V. chlorospora var. salicis-vitellinae Sacc. (1882) = Venturia chlorospora
- V. chlorospora var. sorbi-aucupariae Sacc. (1882) = Venturia chlorospora
- V. cinereofusca (Schwein.) Mussat (1901) = Pezicula cinereofusca, Dermateaceae
- V. circinans (Fr.) Sacc. (1879) = Coleroa circinans
- V. compacta Peck (1873) = Pyrenobotrys compactus
- V. concinna (Petr.) Arx & E. Müll. (1975) = Coleroa concinna
- V. confertissima (Fuckel) Magnus (1891) = Venturia geranii
- V. cucumerina Lindf. (1919), = Plectosphaerella cucumerina, Plectosphaerellaceae
- V. cupressina Rehm (1876) = Asterinella cupressina, Microthyriaceae
- V. cupulata Ellis & G. Martin (1884) = Johansonia cupulata, Johansoniaceae
- V. curviseta Peck (1884) = Antennularia curviseta, Metacapnodiaceae
- V. dickiei (Berk. & Broome) Ces. & De Not. (1863) = Metacoleroa dickiei
- V. ditricha f. piri Bref. (1891) = Venturia ditricha
- V. echinata (Ellis & Everh.) Theiss. (1912) = Acantharia echinata
- V. elegantula Rehm (1885) = Gibbera elegantula
- V. enteleae Dingley (1965) = Mycosphaerella enteleae, Mycosphaerellaceae
- V. epilobiana (Sacc.) Sacc. (1886) = Venturia maculiformis
- V. erysiphoides Ellis & Everh. (1887) = Niesslia erysiphoides, Niessliaceae
- V. exosporioides (Desm.) Sacc. (1881) = Niesslia exosporioides, Niessliaceae
- V. fimbriata Dearn. & House (1921) = Wentiomyces fimbriatus, Pseudoperisporiaceae
- V. fimiseda Mouton (1887) = Antennularia fimiseda, Metacapnodiaceae
- V. formosa Ellis & G. Martin (1892) = Johansonia formosa, Johansoniaceae
- V. fraxini Aderh. (1897) = Fraxinicola fraxini
- V. fuegiana Speg. (1887) = Niesslia fuegiana, Niessliaceae
- V. gaultheriae Ellis & Everh. (1885) = Gibbera gaultheriae
- V. genistae G. Winter (1885) = Keissleriella genistae, Lentitheciaceae
- V. glomerata Cooke (1874) = Coleroa circinans
- V. glomerata var. disseminata J. Schröt. (1887) = Coleroa circinans
- V. grossulariae (Auersw. & Fleischh.) Sacc. (1882) = Antennularia grossulariae, Metacapnodiaceae
- V. hanliniana (U. Braun & Feiler) Unter. (1997) = Tyrannosorus hanlinianus, Dothideomycetes
- V. himalayensis C. Bachm. (1963) = Coleroa himalayensis
- V. hystrioides (Dugan, R.G. Roberts & Hanlin) Crous & U. Braun (2007) = Tyrannosorus hystrioides, Dothideomycetes
- V. ilicifolia Cooke (1866) = Niesslia ilicifolia, Niessliaceae
- V. ilicifolia var. breviseta Sacc. (1886) = Niesslia ilicifolia, Niessliaceae
- V. inaequalis var. cinerascens (Rabenh.) Aderh. (1897) = Venturia inaequalis
- V. iridicola M.E. Barr (1989) = Niesslia iridicola, Niessliaceae
- V. islandica Johanson (1884) = Pseudomassaria islandica, Pseudomassariaceae
- V. johnstonii (Berk. & Broome) Sacc. (1880) = Venturia maculiformis
- V. kalmiae Peck (1876) = Gibbera kalmiae)
- V. kunzei var. ramicola Sacc. & Scalia (1904) = Venturia kunzei
- V. lanea Dearn. (1926) = Niesslia lanea, Niessliaceae
- V. longisetosa Volkart (1912) = Epipolaeum longisetosum, Pseudoperisporiaceae
- V. macrotricha (Berk. & Broome) Ces. & De Not. (1863) = Herpotrichia macrotricha, Melanommataceae
- V. maculosa (Ellis) Ellis (1883) = Antennularia maculosa, Metacapnodiaceae
- V. maculosa (Sacc.) Rulamort (1986) = Venturia macularis
- V. microspora Speg. (1887) = Niesslia microspora; Niessliaceae
- V. microspora Nüesch (1960) = Venturia minuta
- V. myrtilli Cooke (1866) = Gibbera myrtilli
- V. niesslii Sacc. (1882) = Gibbera niesslii
- V. niesslii * nigella Sacc. (1882) = Gibbera niesslii
- V. niesslii subsp. nigella (Sacc.) Sacc. (1883) = Gibbera niesslii
- V. nigella (Sacc.) Mussat (1901) = Gibbera niesslii
- V. nobilis Sacc. (1882) = Niesslia nobilis, Niessliaceae
- V. occidentalis Ellis & Everh. (1886) = Nematostoma occidentale, Pseudoperisporiaceae
- V. oreophila (Speg.) Theiss. (1912) = Wentiomyces oreophilus, Pseudoperisporiaceae
- V. orni M. Ibrahim, M. Schlegel & T.N. Sieber (2016) = Fraxinicola orni
- V. oxydendri F.A. Wolf (1925) = Pseudomassaria oxydendri, Pseudomassariaceae
- V. petasitis (Fuckel) Sacc. (1882) = Epipolaeum petasitis, Pseudoperisporiaceae
- V. populi-albae (M. Morelet) Rulamort (1986) = Venturia tremulae
- V. pulchella Cooke & Peck (1873) = Gibbera pulchella
- V. puyae Speg. (1910) = Niesslia puyae, Niessliaceae
- V. rhododendri Tengwall (1924) = Coleroa rhododendri
- V. rosae De Not. (1844) = Gibbera rosae
- V. sabalicola Ellis & Everh. (1890) = Niesslia sabalicola, Niessliaceae
- V. sacchari (Breda de Haan) Sacc. (1895) = Dimeriella sacchari, Parodiopsidaceae
- V. secedens Tassi (1900) = Niesslia secedens, Niessliaceae
- V. sequoiae Plowr. (1878) = Acanthostigma sequoiae, Tubeufiaceae
- V. spegazziniana Cooke ex Sacc. (1878) = Niesslia spegazziniana, Niessliaceae
- V. speschnewii Sacc. & D. Sacc. (1905) = Coleroa venturioides
- V. sphaerelloidea Höhn. (1909) = Phomatosporopsis sphaerelloidea, Phomatosporaceae
- V. sporoboli H.C. Greene (1952) = Coleroa sporoboli
- V. straussii Sacc. & Roum. (1884) = Metacapnodium ericophilum, Metacapnodiaceae
- V. tarda (Fuckel) Fleischh. (1870) = Iodosphaeria tarda, Iodosphaeriaceae
- V. tirolensis Höhn. (1903) = Pseudomassaria islandica, Pseudomassariaceae
- V. tremulae var. grandidentatae M. Morelet (1985) = Venturia tremulae
- V. tremulae var. populi-albae M. Morelet (1985) = Venturia tremulae
- V. turfosorum Mouton (1886) = Epibryon turfosorum, Epibryaceae
- V. viennotii var. levispora M. Morelet (1985) = Venturia viennotii

== Genomes ==
The complete genome sequence of Venturia effusa, the first complete genome sequence of any species in the genus, was reported in 2019.
