= Federico Venturi =

Italian paleontologist (1940–2020)

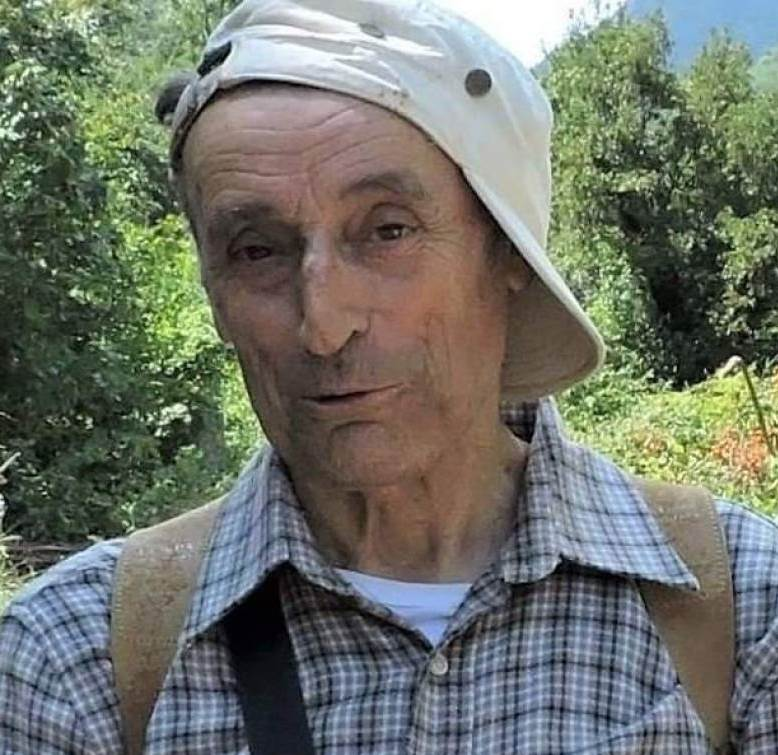
- Born: March 31, 1940; Florence, Italy
- Died: June 27, 2020 (aged 80); Pettorano sul Gizio, Italy

Education
- Education: University of Perugia

Philosophical work
- Institutions: University of Perugia
- Main interests: Early Jurassic ammonite phylogeny, taxonomy

Federico Venturi (March 31, 1940 – June 27, 2020) was an Italian paleontologist. He is internationally known as a specialist of Early Jurassic ammonites.

== Professional life ==
Federico Venturi graduated in Natural Sciences at the University of Perugia in 1969. From 1970 he studied geology and paleontology, and dealt with Jurassic ammonites of the Central Apennines (Umbria, Marche). From 1975 he was a lecturer of paleontology at the University of Perugia. In 1982 he was appointed Associate Professor in the Department of Earth Sciences, and held the position until 2010. He published more than 60 research papers and two books.

He died during a field trip in the Monte Genzana Alto Gizio Nature Reserve, Italy.

== Contribution to paleontology ==
Venturi dealt with ammonites of the Hettangian, Sinemurian, Pliensbachian and Toarcian ages. He studied the evolutions of families Hildoceratidae, Hammatoceratidae and Polymorphitidae. He introduced numerous new taxa (species, genera, subfamilies) alone or with co-authors. Among the 36 new ammonite genera the most important are Rarenodia, Catriceras, Praerycites, Martanites, Gorgheiceras, Paramorphites, Furlites, Neotaffertia, Pelingoceras, Cingolites.

An Italian–English bilingual book ("Ammonites, a geological journey around the Apennine Mountains") summarized his main achievements in the field of ammonite paleontology (biostratigraphy, ecological crises and extinctions, phylogeny, paleobiogeography and taxonomy).
