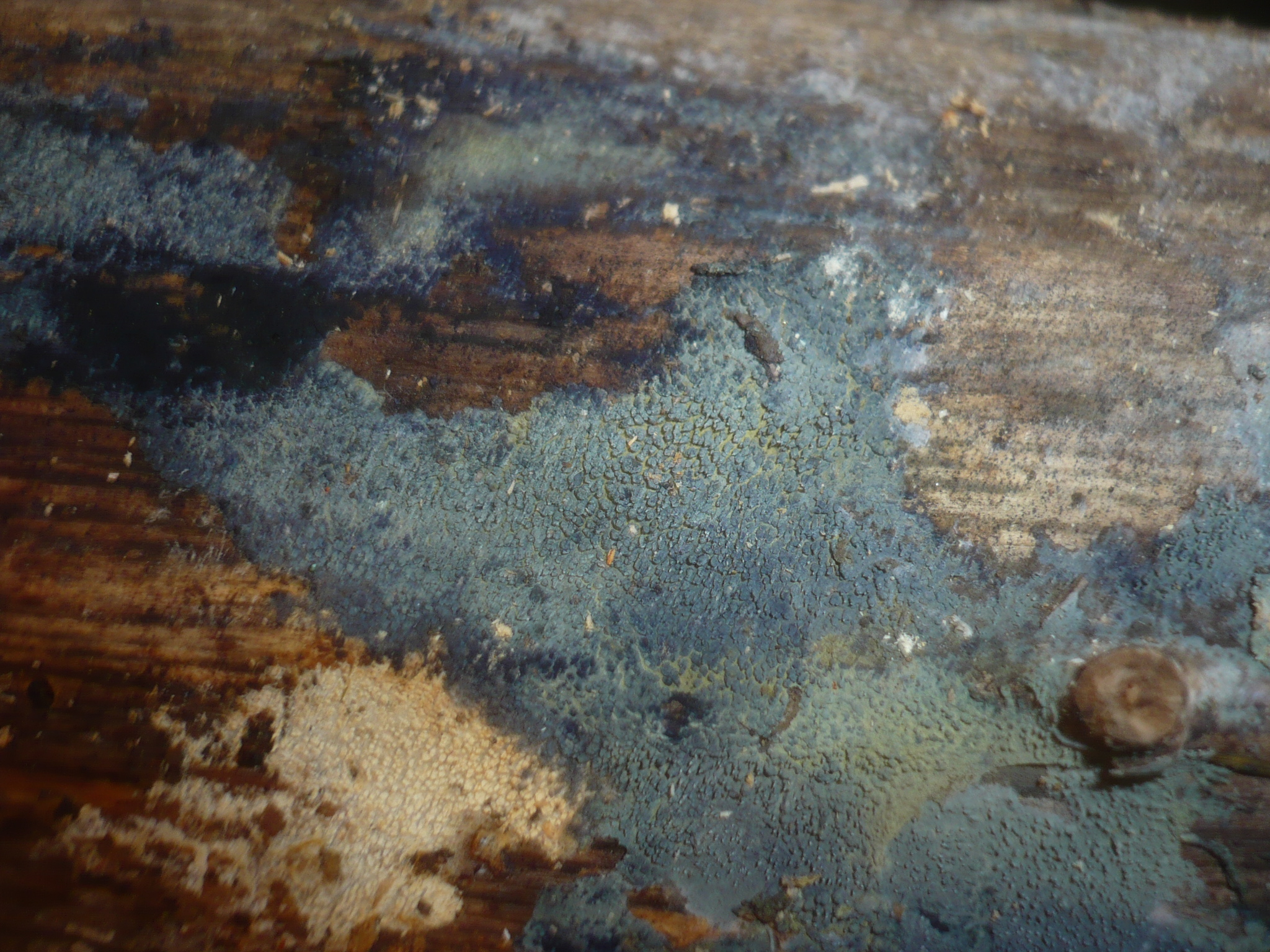
- Amaurodon viridis at Terrou, France

Scientific classification
- Domain: Eukaryota
- Kingdom: Fungi
- Division: Basidiomycota
- Class: Agaricomycetes
- Order: Thelephorales
- Family: Thelephoraceae
- Genus: Amaurodon; J.Schröt. (1888)

Type species
- Amaurodon viridis (Alb. & Schwein.) J.Schröt. (1888)

Species
- See text

= Amaurodon =

Genus of fungi

Amaurodon is a genus of fungi in the family Thelephoraceae. Most species in the genus have resupinate and corticioid (flattened, crust-like) fruit bodies that grow on rotting wood. The hymenophore may have pores, teeth, or be smooth, and is typically blue to green in color.

== Species ==
The following is a list of species in this genus and their associated synonyms (=).

- Amaurodon aeruginascens (Hjortstam & Ryvarden) Kõljalg & K.H.Larss. 1996 – South America

= Tomentellago aeruginascens Hjortstam & Ryvarden

- Amaurodon angulisporus Gardt & Yorou 2011 – West Africa
- Amaurodon aquicoeruleus Agerer 2001 – Western Australia
- Amaurodon atrocyaneus (Wakef.) Kõljalg & K.H.Larss. 1996 – United Kingdom; Venezuela

= Pseudotomentella atrocyanea (Wakef.) Burds. & M.J. Larsen
= Tomentella atrocyanea Wakef.

- Amaurodon caeruleocaseus Svantesson & T.W. May 2021 – Australia
- Amaurodon cyaneus (Wakef.) Kõljalg & K.H.Larss. 1996 – United Kingdom

= Hypochnus cyaneus Wakef.
= Lazulinospora cyanea (Wakef.) Burds. & M.J. Larsen
= Pseudotomentella cyanea (Wakef.) Svrček
= Tomentella cyanea (Wakef.) Bourdot & Galzin

- Amaurodon hydnoides Kõljalg & Ryvarden 1997 – Venezuela
- Amaurodon mustialaensis (P.Karst.) Kõljalg & K.H.Larss. 1996 – Europe

= Coniophora mustialaensis (P. Karst.) Massee
= Corticium mustialaense (P. Karst.) Fr.
= Hypochnopsis mustialaensis (P. Karst.) P. Karst.
= Hypochnus mustialaensis P. Karst. [as 'mustialaënsis' ]
= Lyomyces mustialaensis (P. Karst.) P. Karst.

- Amaurodon sumatranus Miettinen & Kõljalg 2007 – Indonesia
- Amaurodon viridis (Alb. & Schwein.) J.Schröt. 1888 – Europe; Australia – type species

= Acia viridis (Alb. & Schwein.) P. Karst.
= Caldesiella viridis (Alb. & Schwein.) Pat.
= Hydnum viride (Alb. & Schwein.) Fr.
= Hydnum viride var. psittacinum Pers.
= Hydnum viride var. riograndense Rick, in Rambo (Ed.)
= Hypochnus chlorinus Massee
= Odontia viridis (Alb. & Schwein.) Quél.
= Sistotrema viride Alb. & Schwein.
= Tomentella chlorina (Massee) G. Cunn.

- Amaurodon wakefieldiae (Burds. & M.J.Larsen) Kõljalg & K.H.Larss. 1996 – United States

= Lazulinospora wakefieldiae Burds. & M.J. Larsen [as 'wakefieldii' ]
= Tomentella wakefieldiae (Burds. & M.J. Larsen) Stalpers
