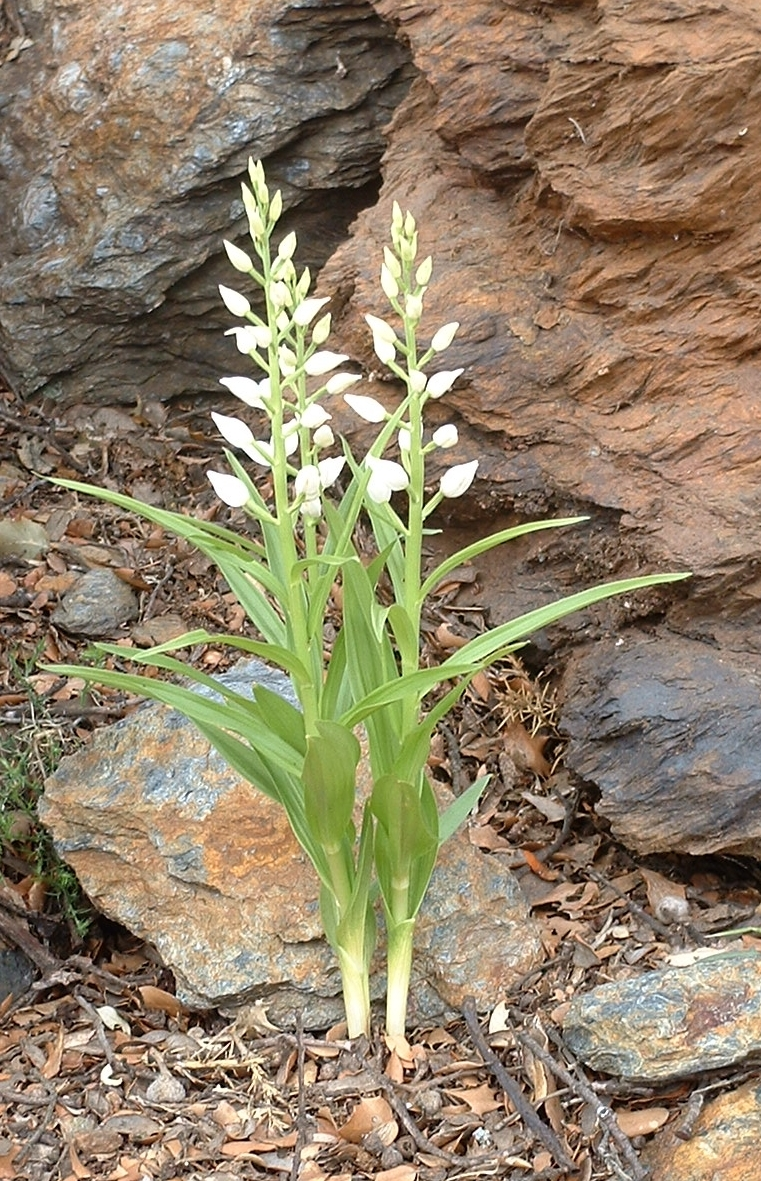

Conservation status
- Least Concern (IUCN 3.1)

Scientific classification
- Kingdom: Plantae
- Clade: Tracheophytes
- Clade: Angiosperms
- Clade: Monocots
- Order: Asparagales
- Family: Orchidaceae
- Subfamily: Epidendroideae
- Genus: Cephalanthera
- Species: C. longifolia

Binomial name
- Cephalanthera longifolia (L.) Fritsch 1888

Synonyms
- Synonyms list: Serapias helleborine var. longifolia L.; Cephalanthera ensifolia (Sw.) Rich.; Cephalanthera xiphophyllum Reichenb.; Epipactis ensifolia F.W. Schmidt; Epipactis longifolia (L.) All.; Serapias helleborine subsp. longifolia L.; Serapias longifolia (L.) L.; Serapias xiphophyllum Ehrh. ex L.f.; Helleborine longifolia (L.) Moench; Epipactis grandiflora (L.) Sm.; Cymbidium xiphophyllum (Ehrh. ex L.f.) Sw.; Epipactis xiphophylla (Ehrh. ex L.f.) Sw.; Serapias pallida Wahlenb.; Cephalanthera pallens Rich.; Serapias ensifolia (L.f.) Murray; Epipactis grandifolia All.; Cephalanthera acuminata Wall. ex Lindl; Cephalanthera maravignae Tineo in G.Gussone; Cephalanthera thomsonii Rchb.f.; Cephalanthera angustifolia Simonk.; Limodorum acuminatum (Wall. ex Lindl.) Kuntze; Cephalanthera mairei Schltr.; Cephalanthera conferta (B.Baumann & H.Baumann) Kreutz; Cephalanthera longifolia subsp. conferta B.Baumann & H.Baumann

= Cephalanthera longifolia =

Species of orchid

Cephalanthera longifolia, the narrow-leaved helleborine, sword-leaved helleborine or long-leaved helleborine, is a rhizomatous herbaceous perennial plant in the family Orchidaceae. It is native to light woodland, and widespread across Europe, Asia and North Africa from Ireland and Morocco to China. This includes the United Kingdom, Iran, Russia, Kazakhstan, Turkey, Algeria, India, Pakistan, Germany, Italy, France, Spain, Portugal and many other countries.

== Description ==
Cephalanthera longifolia reaches on average 20–60 centimetres (7.9–23.6 in) in height in typical conditions. This orchid has erect and glabrous multiple stems. The leaves are dark green, long and narrowly tapering (hence the common name "sword-leaved helleborine"). The inflorescence is a lax, 5-20 flowered spike with the bell-shaped flowers ascending in an oblique spiral. The flowers are white, about 1 cm (0.4 in) long, with a yellow-edged labellum and they usually open only during the warmest and brightest hours of the day. This plant can be found in bloom from April to June, depending on location and altitude. The fruit is a dry capsule and the dust-like seed is dispersed by the wind.

One unusual characteristic of this species is that some individuals are achlorophyllous (lacking green pigment) and take all their nutrition from mycorrhizal fungi.

== Ecology ==
The flowers are pollinated by solitary burrowing bees. The flowers produce little nectar and the yellowish dust on the labellum which the insects collect is of little nutritional value. The actual pollen is contained in two pollinia which adhere to the hairs on the bee's back.

An investigation in Estonia determined that the mycorrhizal partners of this orchid species include Thelephoraceae and Helotiales. Another investigation indicated 9 mycorrhizal partners (still fewer than those recorded for Cephalanthera damasonium): Bjerkandera adusta, Phlebia acerina, Sebacinaceae, Tetracladium sp., and Tomentella sp.

Cephelanthera longifolia is vulnerable to grazing by deer.

== Distribution ==
Cephalanthera longifolia is common in some parts of its European range, such as southern France and Spain, but endangered particularly in northern areas such as Belgium. In Britain and Ireland it is a quite uncommon and declining species, and conservation work is being carried out at a number of sites to safeguard it (see also Galley Down Wood). In 2007 it was listed as a priority species under the UK Biodiversity Action Plan. The charity Plantlife International is leading this work in the United Kingdom.

== Habitat ==
Sword-leaved helleborine usually grows in damp woodland places (mainly oak and beech), forest edges and rocky slopes. These plants prefer calcareous soils and in well exposed places, at an altitude of 0–1,400 metres (0–4,593 ft) above sea level.

This species was once abundant, when forests were used for grazing livestock and trees were coppiced, but is now threatened by overgrowth of larger plants. As the flower spikes are eaten by deer, the sword-leaved helleborine is also threatened by the increase of deer populations following extirpation of large predators like the wolf and brown bear in many parts of Europe.

== Etymology ==
The genus name Cephalanthera comes from the Greek κεφαλή kephalē (head) and ἄνθηρα anthēra (anther): the anther is placed at the top (head) of the column. The Latin name longifolia means with long leaves .

"Helleborine" may refer to deer using the orchid for food (many conservationists have noted that helleborine orchids are grazed by deer). Alternatively it may denote that the plants are similar to hellebores (a group of species in the family Ranunculaceae). "Hellebore" comes from the Greek "álkē" and "bora", translating as "fawn" and "food of beasts".

== Gallery ==
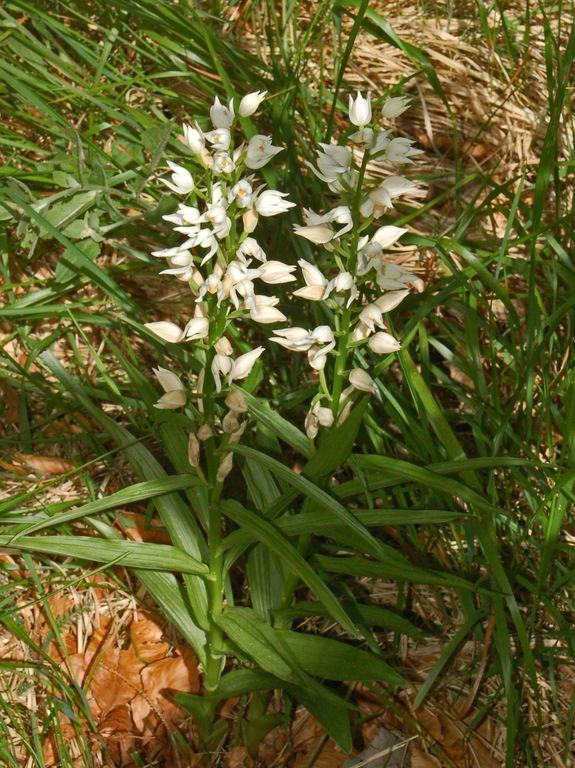
Whole plant

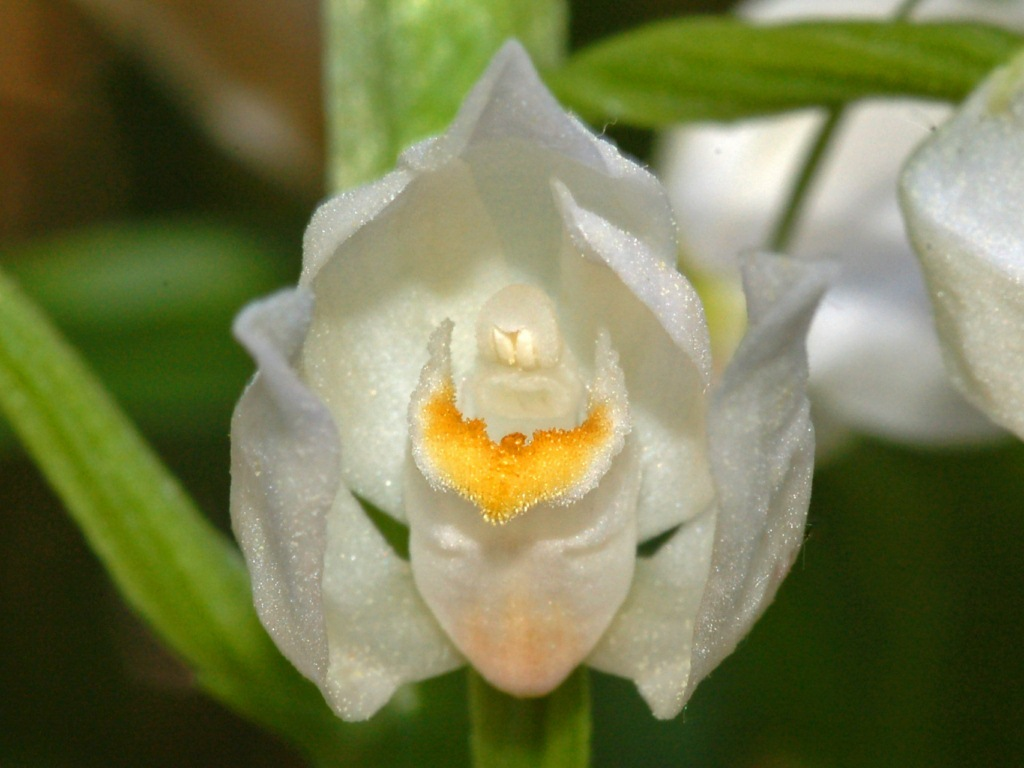
Close-up on a flower

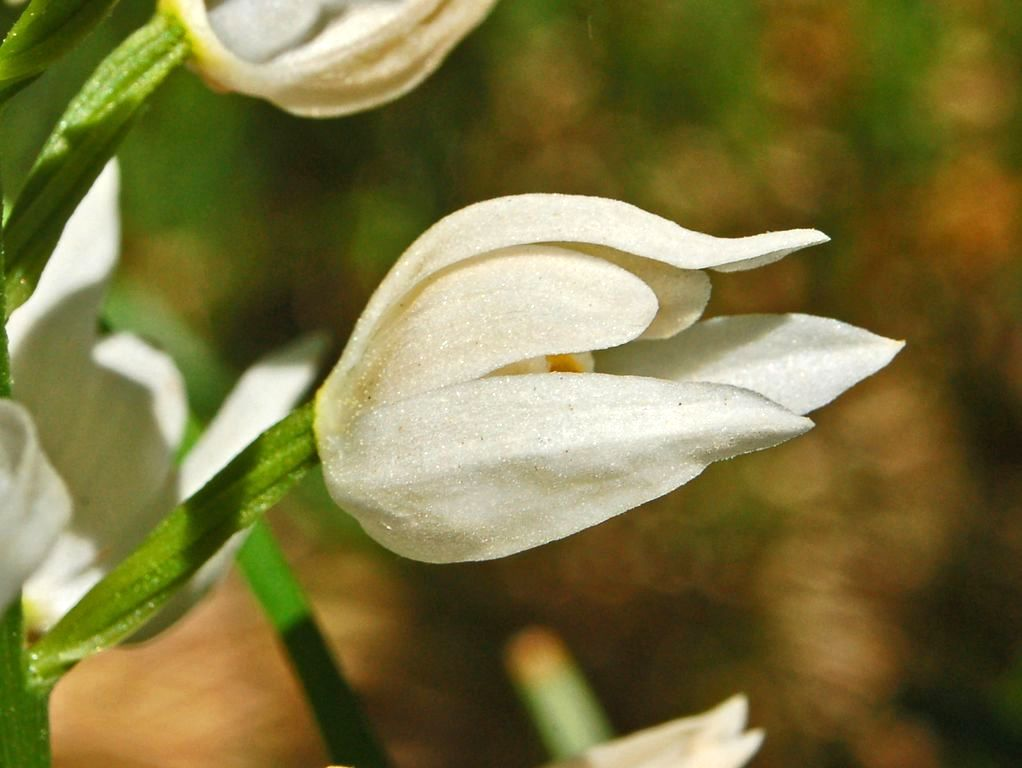
Flower

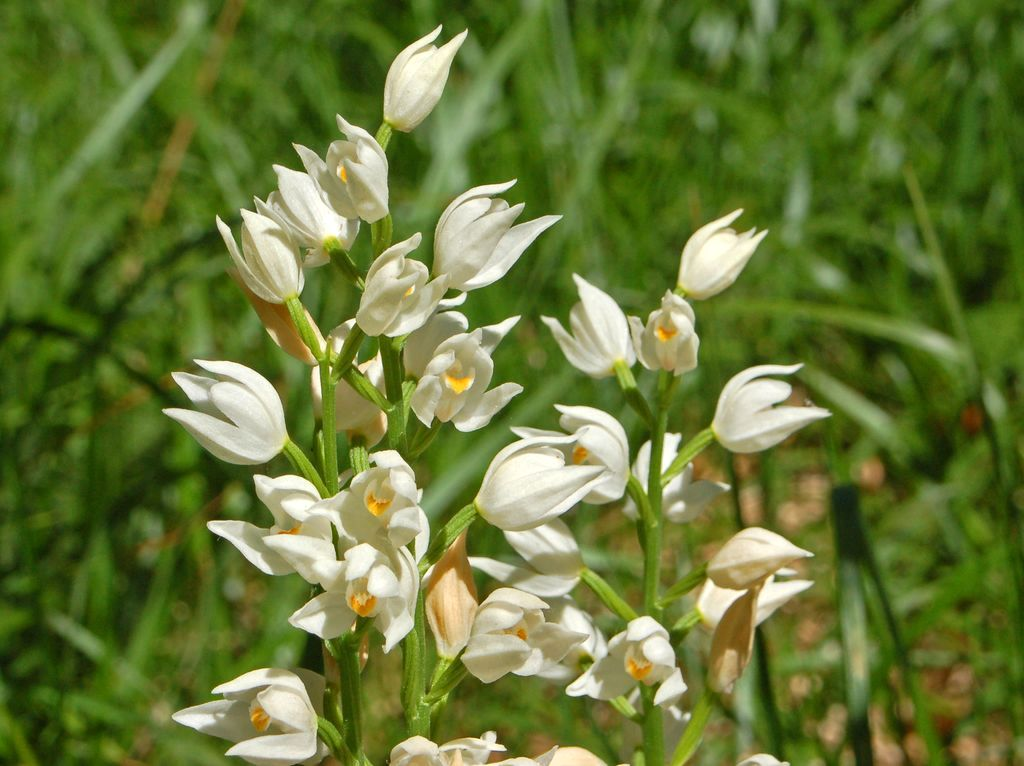
Inflorescence

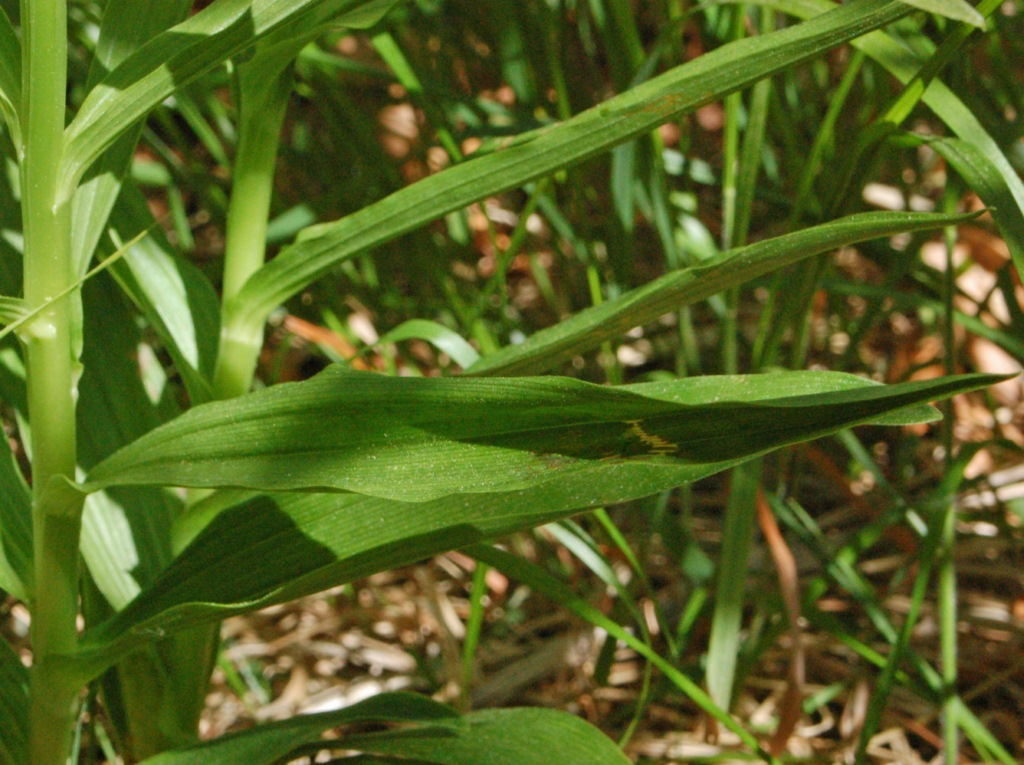
Leaves

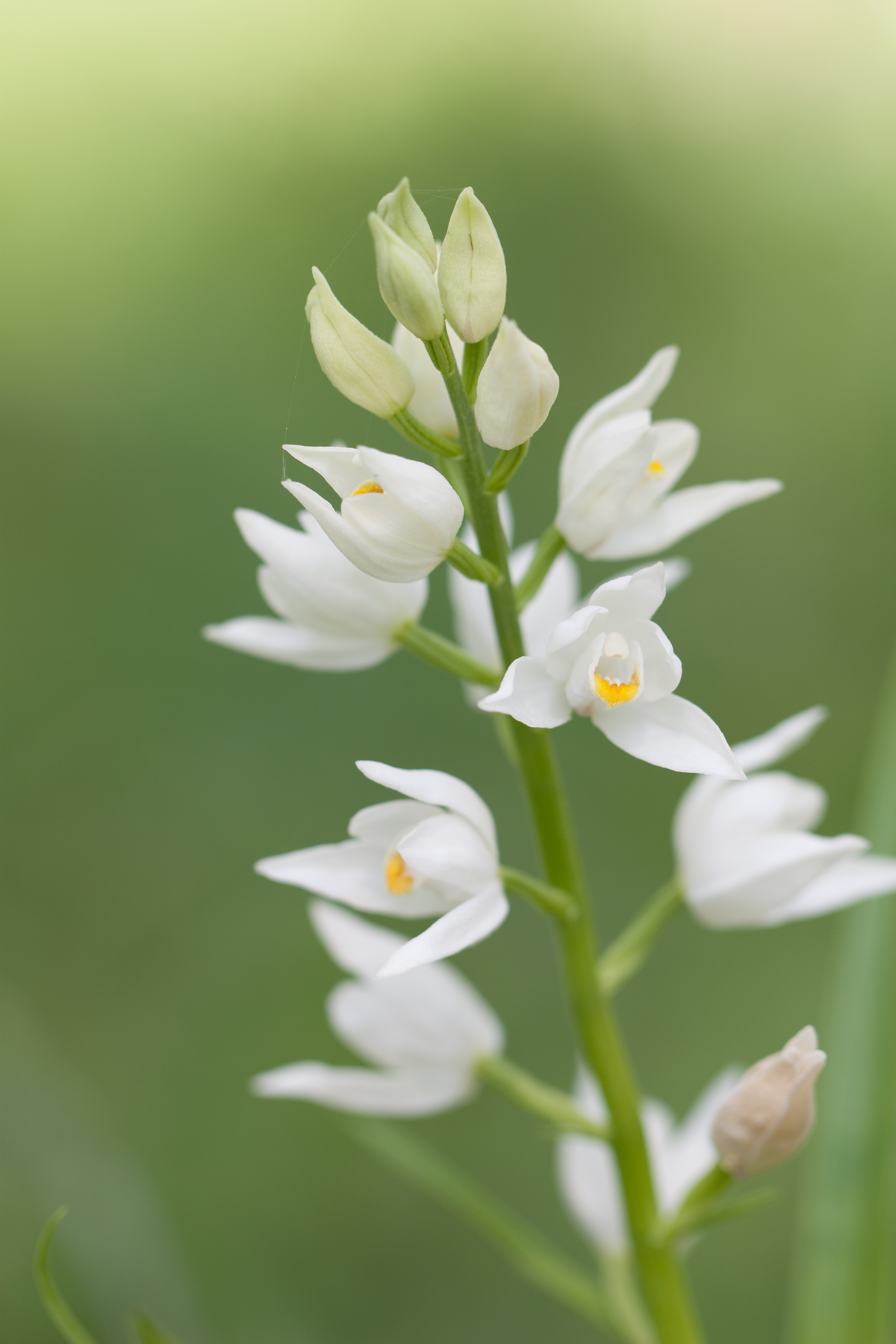
Inflorescence
