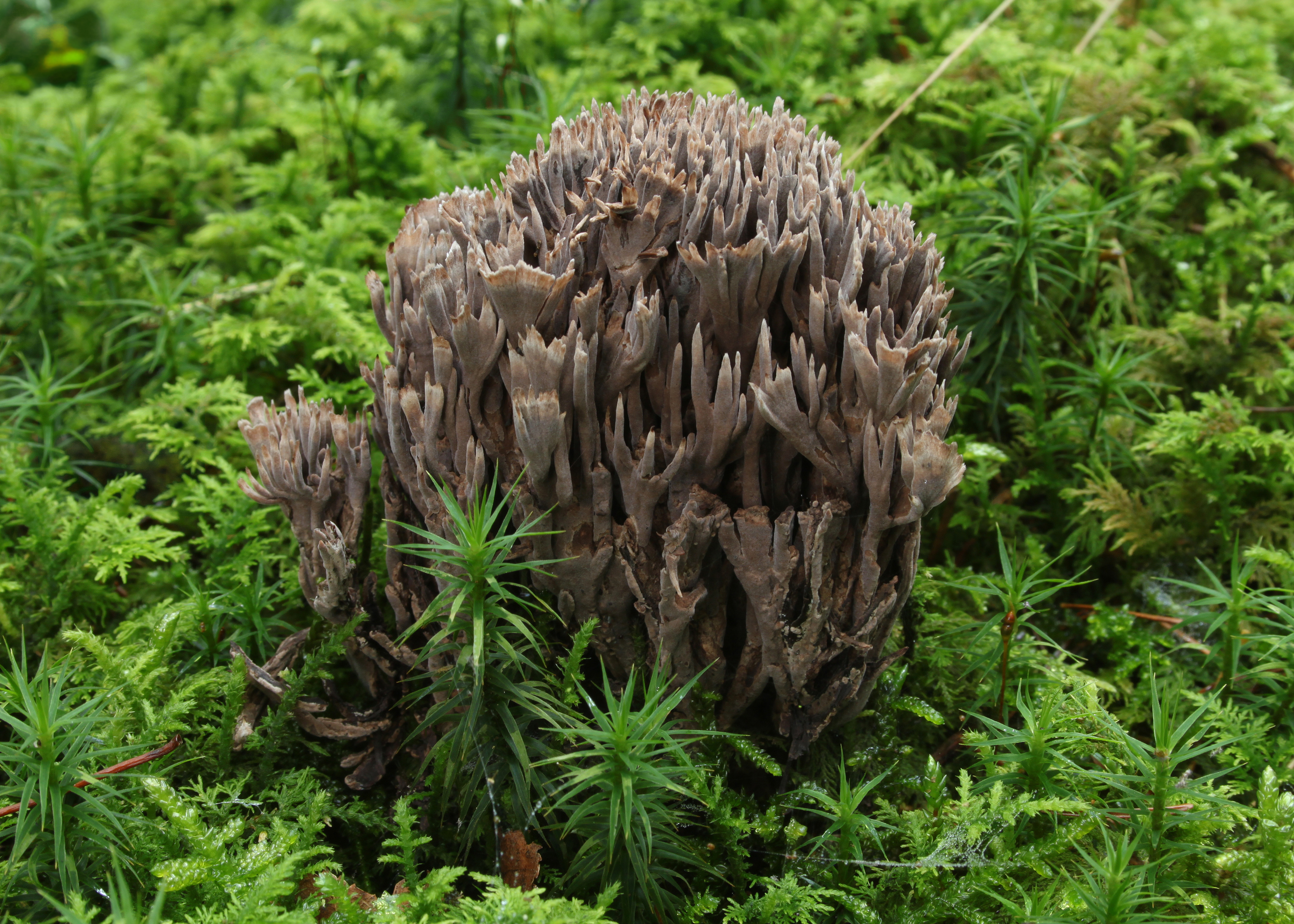

Scientific classification
- Kingdom: Fungi
- Division: Basidiomycota
- Class: Agaricomycetes
- Order: Thelephorales
- Family: Thelephoraceae
- Genus: Thelephora
- Species: T. palmata

Binomial name
- Thelephora palmata (Scop.) Fr. (1821)

Synonyms
- Clavaria palmata Scop. (1772); Ramaria palmata (Scop.) Holmsk. (1790); Merisma foetidum Pers. (1797); Merisma palmatum (Scop.) Pers. (1822); Phylacteria palmata (Scop.) Pat. (1887); Clavaria schaefferi Sacc. (1888)

= Thelephora palmata =

Species of clavarioid fungus

Thelephora palmata
- Mycological characteristics
- Smooth hymenium
- No distinct cap
- Hymenium attachment is not applicable
- Stipe is bare
- Spore print is reddish-brown
- Ecology is mycorrhizal
- Edibility is inedible

Thelephora palmata commonly known as the fetid false coral or stinking earthfan, is a species of clavarioid fungus in the family Thelephoraceae. The fruit bodies are leathery and coral-like, with branches that are narrow at the base before widening out like a fan and splitting into numerous flattened prongs. The wedge-like tips are whitish when young, but darken as the fungus matures. The common names of the fungus refers to its pungent odor, likened to fetid garlic.

A widely distributed but uncommon species, it is found in Eurasia, Australia, and the Americas, where it fruits on the ground in both coniferous and mixed forests.

== Taxonomy ==
The species was first described in 1772 by Italian naturalist Giovanni Antonio Scopoli, as Clavaria palmata. Elias Fries transferred it to the genus Thelephora in 1821. The species has several synonyms, resulting from several generic transfers in its taxonomic history, including Ramaria by Johan Theodor Holmskjold in 1790, Merisma by Christian Hendrik Persoon in 1822, and Phylacteria by Narcisse Théophile Patouillard in 1887. Other historical synonyms are Merisma foetidum, published by Christian Hendrik Persoon in 1797, and Pier Andrea Saccardo's 1888 Clavaria schaefferi. Persoon also published a species with the name Thelephora palmata in 1822, but because the name was already in use, it is an illegitimate homonym; this species is now known as Thelephora anthocephala.

Despite its coral-like appearance, Thelephora palmata is closely related to some fungi with a distinctly bracket-like appearance, such as T. terrestris and T. caryophyllea. The specific epithet palmata is derived from Latin, and means "having the shape of a hand". It is known by the common names "stinking earthfan" and "fetid false coral". Samuel Frederick Gray called it the "stinking branch-ear" in his 1821 work A Natural Arrangement of British Plants.

== Description ==
Perhaps one of the most fetid of fungi is Thelephora palmata. Some specimens were on one occasion taken by Mr. Berkeley into his bedroom at Aboyne, when, after an hour or two, he was horrified at finding the scent far worse than that of any dissecting room. He was anxious to save the specimens, but the scent was so powerful that it was quite intolerable till he had wrapped them in twelve thick folds of the strongest brown paper. Mordecai Cubitt Cooke, 1888

The fruit body of T. palmata is a coral-like tuft that is repeatedly branched from a central stalk, reaching dimensions of 3.5–6.5 cm (1 3/8–2 1/2 in) tall. The branches of the fruit body end in spoon- to fan-shaped tips that are frequently fringed or grooved. The branches of the fruit body are initially whitish in color, but gradually turn gray to lilac-brown in maturity; the tips, however, remain whitish, or paler than the lower parts. The flesh is tough and leathery. The hymenium (fertile, spore-bearing tissue) is amphigenous, that is, it occurs on all surfaces of the fruit body.

The odor of the fruit body is quite unpleasant, resembling fetid garlic, "old cabbage water", or "overripe cheese". It has been called "a candidate for stinkiest fungus in the forest". The unpleasant odor intensifies after drying. Fruit bodies are not edible.

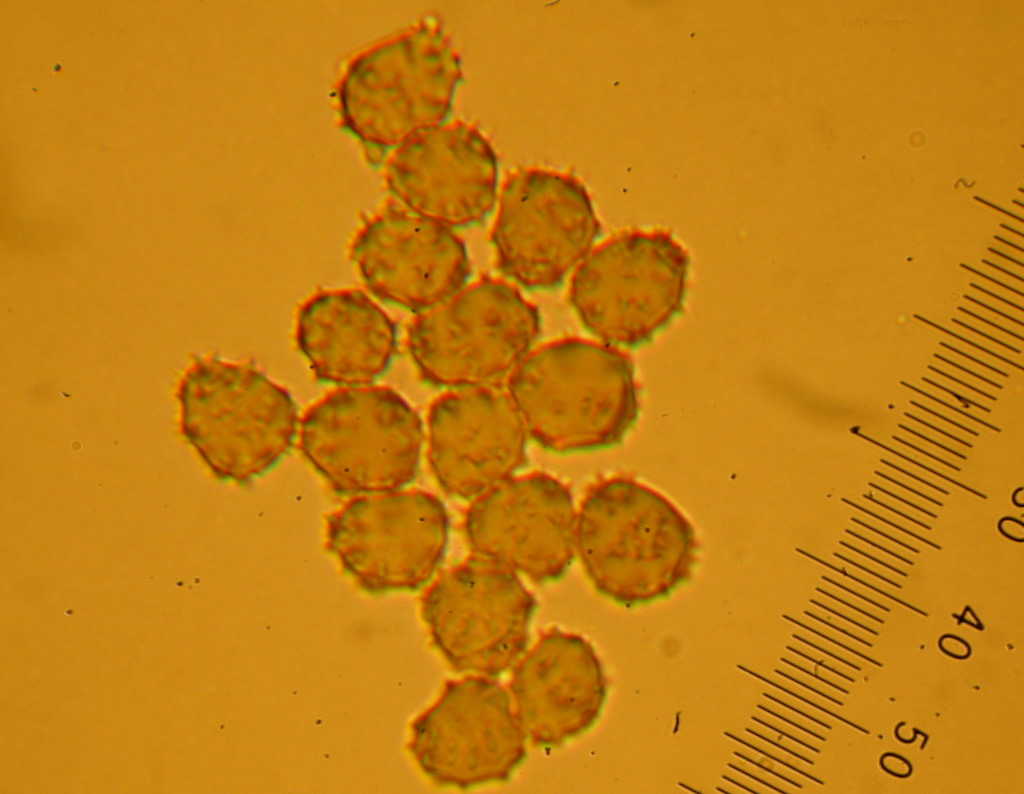
The spores are elliptical and have fine spines situated on warts.

In deposit, the spores are purple-brown to brown. Viewed with a microscopic, the spores appear purple, angular with lobes, and warted, with fine spines measuring 0.5–1.5 μm long; the overall dimensions of the elliptic spores are 8–12 by 7–9 μm. They contain one or two oil drops. The basidia (spore-bearing cells) measure 70–100 by 9–12 μm, and have sterigmata that are 2–4 μm thick by 7–12 μm long. The flesh stains deep blue when a drop of potassium hydroxide solution is applied. The fungus contains the pigment thelephoric acid.

Thelephora anthocephala is somewhat similar in appearance, but can be distinguished by branches that taper upward, branch tips that are flattened (instead of spoon-like), and the lack of a fetid odor. The North American species T. vialis has smaller spores and a more variable color. Darker Ramaria species are distinguished by their non-leathery flesh texture and pointy branch tips.

== Habitat and distribution ==
Thelephora palmata is an ectomycorrhizal species, forming mutualistic associations with conifers. The fruit bodies grow singly, scattered, or in groups on the ground in both coniferous and mixed forests and grassy fields. A preference has been noted for moist ground and locations along woodland paths. An uncommon species, fruit bodies can be difficult to see because they blend well into their surroundings.

The species is found in Asia (including China, Iran, Japan, Siberia Turkey, and Vietnam), Europe, North America, and South America (Brazil and Colombia). It has also been recorded from Australia and Fiji. Fruit bodies are consumed by the springtail species Ceratophysella denisana.

== Uses ==
The fruit bodies can be used for mushroom dyeing. Depending on the mordant used, colors ranging from blackish brown to dark grayish green to greenish brown can be obtained from the dyeing process; without a mordant, a light-brown color is produced.
