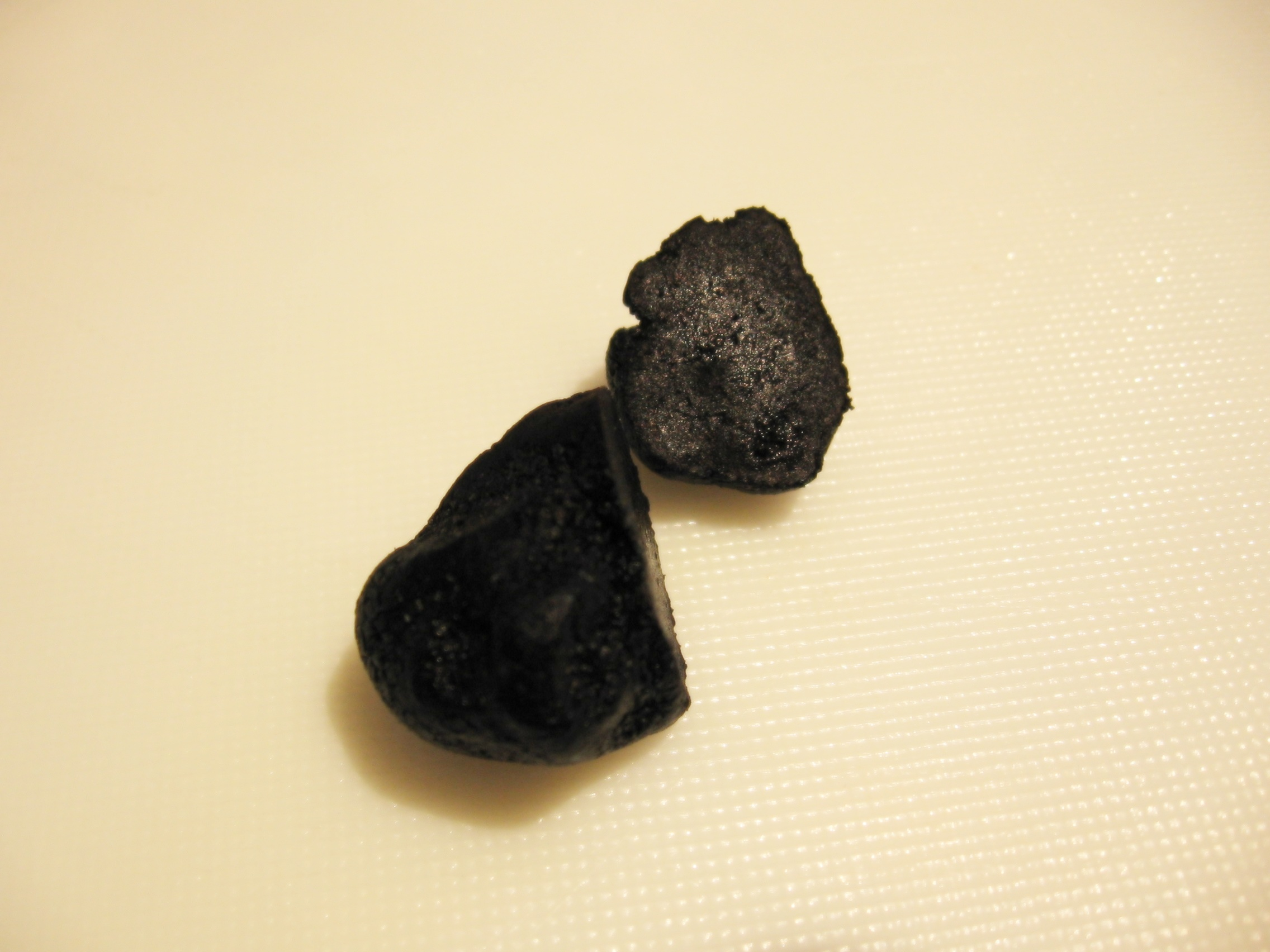

Scientific classification
- Kingdom: Fungi
- Division: Ascomycota
- Class: Pezizomycetes
- Order: Pezizales
- Family: Tuberaceae
- Genus: Tuber
- Species: T. indicum

Binomial name
- Tuber indicum Cooke and Massee (1892)

= Tuber indicum =

Species of truffle

Tuber indicum, commonly known as the Chinese black truffle or the Asian black truffle, is an edible fungus known for its hypogean fruiting bodies, characteristic of the Tuber genus. It is found natively in Himalayan India and parts of China, but has also been found invasively in the United States and Italy. It is sold commercially and often confused with Tuber melanosporum.

This species has made China the world's largest exporter of truffles, both by mass and by money moved. It is also increasingly consumed domestically.

== Taxonomy ==
The species was originally described in the Himalayas by Cooke and Massee (1892). It is named "indicum", from the Latin word for India, due to the location of discovery. The species (in the broad sense) is genetically diverse and has a lot of morphological variation. It is better-characterized as a species complex containing many species known as the "Asian Black Truffle".

Chinese and Oregonian samples identified as T. indicum are genetically closer to T. melanosporum than any other truffle, according to a 2010 rDNA analysis.

A work has been published deliminating T. indicum sensu lato into various smaller species (making it a species complex). According to it the Yunannese population, which is the main one being used for export, is to be known as T. sinense. Further classification detailing the morphological and molecular tell-tales has been done, though without much relevance on terminology used in the market at large.

Phylogeny of the Melanosporum phylogroup

- - - - - T. formosanum China
        - - T. sinense China
          - T. yigongense China
      - T. longispinosum Japan
    - T. melanosporum Italy
  - - T. pseudobrumale China
    - - T. pesudohimalayaense China
      - T. variabilisporum China
- T. brumale Italy

Fan et al., 2022. Multigene, maximum-likelihood figure 1.

Members of the T. indicum complex:

- T. indicum - Himalayas. No sequence data available from Himalayas, so no way to check whether it is the same as any of these below.
- T. sinense - Sichuan, Yunnan. Sequence available.
- T. formosanum - Described from Taiwan, widespread across East Asia. Sequence available.
- T. pseudobrumale - Sequence available.
- T. pseudohimalayense - Widespread across China (mainly produced from Sichuan), known as "female truffle" locally. Sequence data available from Fan et al. Is either also known as T. pseudoexcavatum.
- T. yigongense - Tiebt. Sequence available. Described in 2018.
- T. variabilisporum - Sequence available, described 2022.
- Tuber sp. CHN-10 - Known in 2022 from sequence only.

The rest of this article uses T. indicum in the broad sense, focusing especially on the commericially-importnant Yunnan population.

== Description ==
Tuber indicum
- Mycological characteristics
- Glebal hymenium
- Hymenium attachment is not applicable
- Lacks a stipe
- Spore print is black
- Edibility is choice

Known for its dark brown, lumpy or round fruiting bodies commonly known as truffles. They are modified apothecia, also known as stereothecia, and each of their asci produce around 3-5 ellipsoid spores with a variety of ornamentation. The peridium has angular warts, subhexagonal or polygonal in shape. At maturity, the gleba is reddish to purplish black with white veins.

== Habitat and ecology ==
Like other Tuber species, they produce an aroma that attracts animals, leading to the dispersal of their spores through feces. The spores are thick-walled, allowing them to remain intact through the digestive system. It is a hypogean fungus, with the fruiting bodies growing underground and maturing in winter.

It forms an ectomycorrhizal relationship with various trees such as pines, oaks, and chestnuts (For example, Pinus armandii, Quercus pubescens, and Castanea mollissima). It is known to successfully form a symbiosis with a wide range of hosts, increasing its invasibility. Like T. melanosporum, this species complex is known to be heterothallic, meaning hyphae of different mating types need to meet before a fruiting body (truffle) forms.

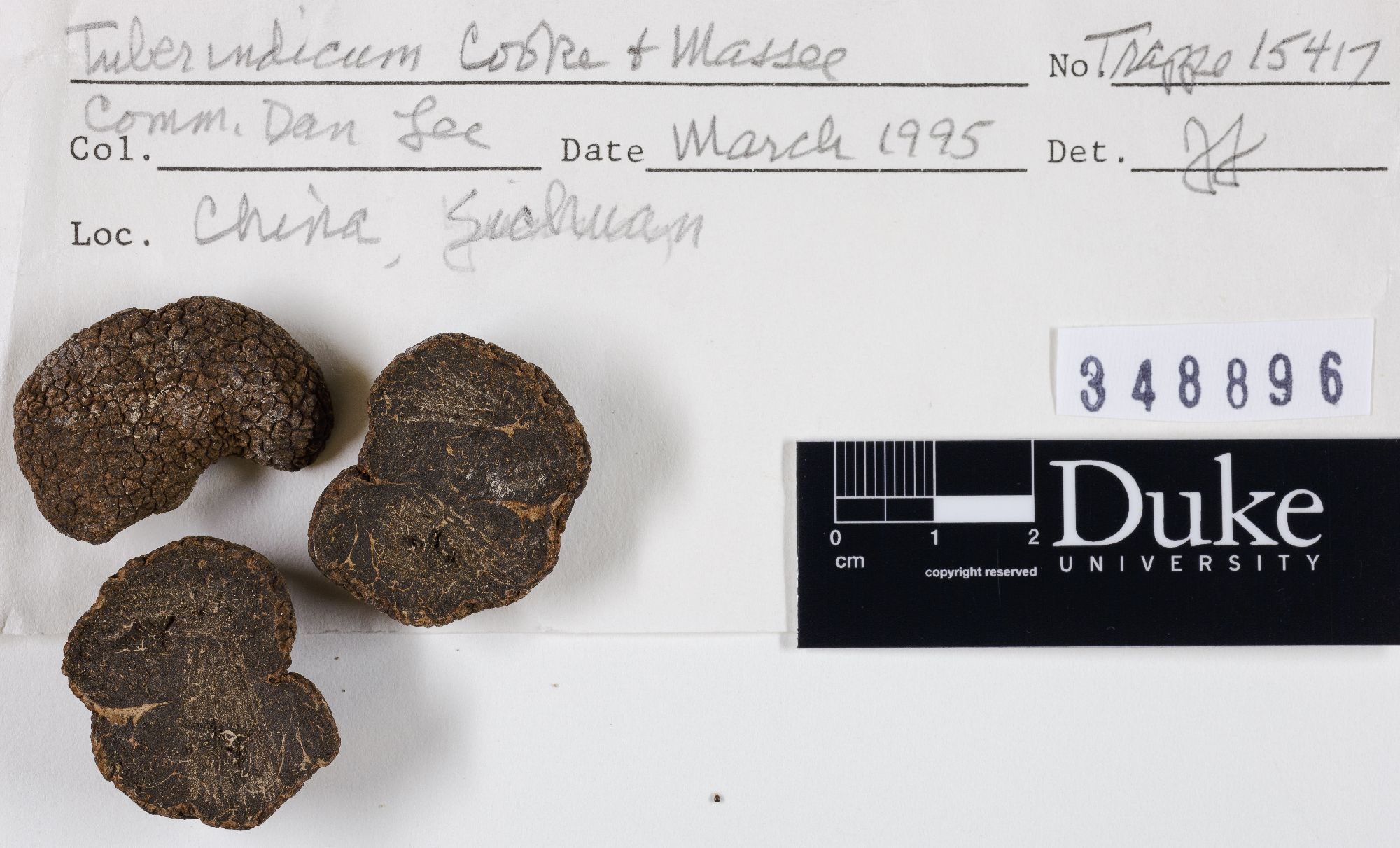
Tuber indicum specimens from the Duke University Herbarium Fungal Collection

It is also known to have an effect on the surrounding microbial community. For example, one study shows the effects of the species when growing in symbiosis with Quercus aliena. They noted an increase in richness and diversity of prokaryotes, such as Proteobacteria, Actinobacteria, Bacteroidetes, and Chloroflexi in the surrounding soil. At the same time, there was a decrease in richness and diversity of fungal species.

The species can be found natively in Himalayan India and parts of China, as well as invasively in the United States and Italy on trees inoculated with T. melanosporum, threatening that species.

In Yunnan, this fungus ripens in November through February. The optimal harvesting period spans from November to Janurary.

== Conservation status ==
The species has been preliminary assessed in 2013 as Near Threatened on the Global Fungal Red List. It is mainly harvested wild, which has led to overharvesting and habitat destruction as its demand increases. Collection of immature specimens as well as destructive harvesting methods have contributed to their decline.

The Yunnan Provincial Forestry and Grassland Bureau has published some guidelines on maintaining a woodland habitat for T. indicum, including maintaining tree density, humus thickness, soil humidity, soil stability, and sustainable harvesting methods.

== Uses ==
Because it is nearly identical to T. melanosporum, it is often sold fraudulently to those wishing to purchase the more expensive and highly prized truffle. It has been suggested by one study to screen for certain aromatic compounds in order to prevent fraudulent sale of T. indicum.

T. indicum is also valued internationally, but many see it as the inferior species. Its increased popularity has led to habitat destruction.

Before its discovery as a culinary truffle, locals in Yunnan used it as pig food, preferring instead other mushrooms such as Macrolepiota albuminosa, matsutake, Thelephora ganbajun, and various boletes. It is locally known as Chinese: 猪拱菌; pinyin: Zhūgǒngjūn; lit. 'Pig-humped fungus'.
