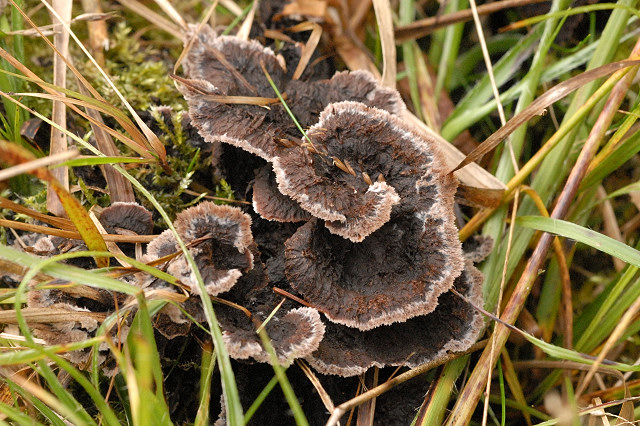

Conservation status
- Secure (NatureServe)

Scientific classification
- Kingdom: Fungi
- Division: Basidiomycota
- Class: Agaricomycetes
- Order: Thelephorales
- Family: Thelephoraceae
- Genus: Thelephora
- Species: T. terrestris

Binomial name
- Thelephora terrestris Ehrh. (1787)

= Thelephora terrestris =

Species of fungus

Thelephora terrestris, commonly known as the common fiber vase or earthfan fungus is an inedible species of fungus in the Basidiomycota phylum.

== Taxonomy ==
This fungus was first described by Jakob Friedrich Ehrhart in 1787.

== Description ==
Thelephora terrestris is present year round, though is mostly seen July to December. As the basidiome forms, it starts off lighter in colour then turns to a darker shade of brown as it ages. A stipe may not be present, if there is one, it is usually very short. Sometimes the fungus is grown in large colonies. The shape is described as a fan and can grow up to 6 centimetres (2 1/4 in) wide. It has been described to have a moldy earth-like smell.

Thelephora terrestris
- Mycological characteristics
- Smooth hymenium
- No distinct cap
- Hymenium attachment is not applicable
- Stipe is bare
- Spore print is purple-brown
- Ecology is mycorrhizal
- Edibility is inedible

The hyphae of mycorrhizal forms walls that becomes thicker as it ages, while in earlier stages may be spiney. When mating, the hyphae forms clamp connections The spores are purple-brown colour, ellipsoid or angular shape.

The edibility of this fungus is unknown, but it is considered too tough to be worthwhile.

=== Similar species ===
Thelephora palmata is comparatively stinky and less widely distributed. T. vialis is more robust; Cotylidia diaphana and Podoscypha petalodes are similar; Hydnellum can appear similar but has teeth below.

== Habitat and ecology ==
Throughout North America and Europe Thelephora terrestris can be found in soil. It is commonly found in sandy soils under pine trees, on roots and twigs.

This ectomycorrhizal fungus forms a symbiotic relationship known as mycorrhizae, especially with Pinus species. It is commonly found in pine forests as well as plant nursery soils world wide. This fungus is known to get water and nutrients from far away and being capable of growing in both low fertility and high fertility soils.

It is a dominant mycorrhizal fungus, re-establishes quickly after disturbances such as forest fire, and is considered stress tolerant.

Outside of the Pinus genus, it is also capable of forming mycorrizha with other trees such as alder, birch, oak, beech, and poplar.

Thelephora terrestris virus 1 (TtV1), which is a mycovirus, can infect this fungus.

== Physiology ==
The full life cycle can be reproduced and studied in a laboratory, both ectomycorrhizal form and mushroom form.

Due to the mycotoxins that the fungi produces, it protects pinus trees from root pathogen Phytophthora cinnamomi.
