= Tomentellopsis =

Scientific classification
- Kingdom: Fungi
- Division: Basidiomycota
- Class: Agaricomycetes
- Order: Thelephorales
- Family: Thelephoraceae
- Genus: Tomentellopsis; Hjortstam

Synonyms
- Byssocristella M.P.Christ. & J.E.B.Larsen

Genus of fungus

Tomentellopsis is a genus of fungus. There are nine species assigned to this genus:

- Tomentellopsis bresadolana (Sacc. & Trotter) Jülich & Stalpers
- Tomentellopsis echinospora (Ellis) Hjortstam
- Tomentellopsis pallidoaurantiaca (Gilb. & Budington) K.H. Larss. ex Ginns & M.N.L. Lefebvre
- Tomentellopsis pallidocitrina (M.P. Christ. & J.E.B. Larsen) Hjortstam
- Tomentellopsis pulchella Kõljalg & Bernicchia
- Tomentellopsis pusilla Hjortstam
- Tomentellopsis rosannae Kuhar & Gresl.
- Tomentellopsis submollis (Svrček) Hjortstam
- Tomentellopsis zygodesmoides (Ellis) Hjortstam
