= Amaurodon aeruginascens =

Scientific classification
- Domain: Eukaryota
- Kingdom: Fungi
- Division: Basidiomycota
- Class: Agaricomycetes
- Order: Thelephorales
- Family: Thelephoraceae
- Genus: Amaurodon
- Species: A. aeruginascens

Binomial name
- Amaurodon aeruginascens (Hjortstam & Ryvarden) Kõljalg & K.H.Larss.

Synonyms
- Tomentellago aeruginascens Hjortstam & Ryvarden (1988)

Species of fungus

Amaurodon aeruginascens is a species of fungus belonging to the family Thelephoraceae. It is native to Central America.
