= Golden orchid =

Golden orchid is a common name for several plants and may refer to:

- Cephalanthera falcata, native to Japan, Korea, and China
- Dendrobium discolor, native to northern Australia, New Guinea, and Indonesia
