= Amaurodon caeruleocaseus =

Scientific classification
- Domain: Eukaryota
- Kingdom: Fungi
- Division: Basidiomycota
- Class: Agaricomycetes
- Order: Thelephorales
- Family: Thelephoraceae
- Genus: Amaurodon
- Species: A. caeruleocaseus

Binomial name
- Amaurodon caeruleocaseus Svantesson & T.W.May (2021)

Species of fungus

Amaurodon caeruleocaseus is a species of fungus in the family Thelephoraceae. It was described by Sten Svantesson and Tom W. May in 2021. It is unique within its genus in that its basidiome is stipitate. The specific epithet is Latin (a compound of 'blue' and 'cheese'), named for the basidiome's resemblance to blue cheese. The type locality is Denmark, Western Australia.

== See also ==
- Fungi of Australia
