= Galley Down Wood =

Geological site in England

Coordinates: 50.968°N 1.185°W

- Site of Special Scientific Interest
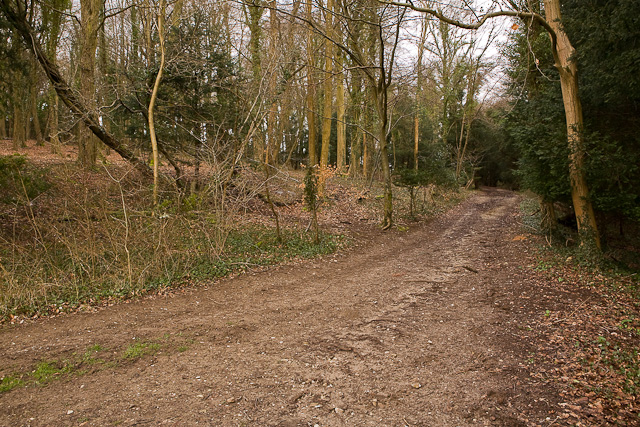
- Location of Galley Down Wood.
- Area of search: Hampshire
- Grid reference: SU 573 190
- Interest: Biological
- Area: 16.6 hectares (41 acres)
- Notification date: 1988
- Location map: Magic Map

Galley Down Wood is a 16.6-hectare (41-acre) biological Site of Special Scientific Interest north-east of Bishop's Waltham in Hampshire.

This wood, which was planted with beech trees in around 1930, has a well developed beech flora. Flowering plants include bird's-nest orchid, white helleborine, greater butterfly-orchid, common spotted orchid and the nationally rare long-leaved helleborine.
