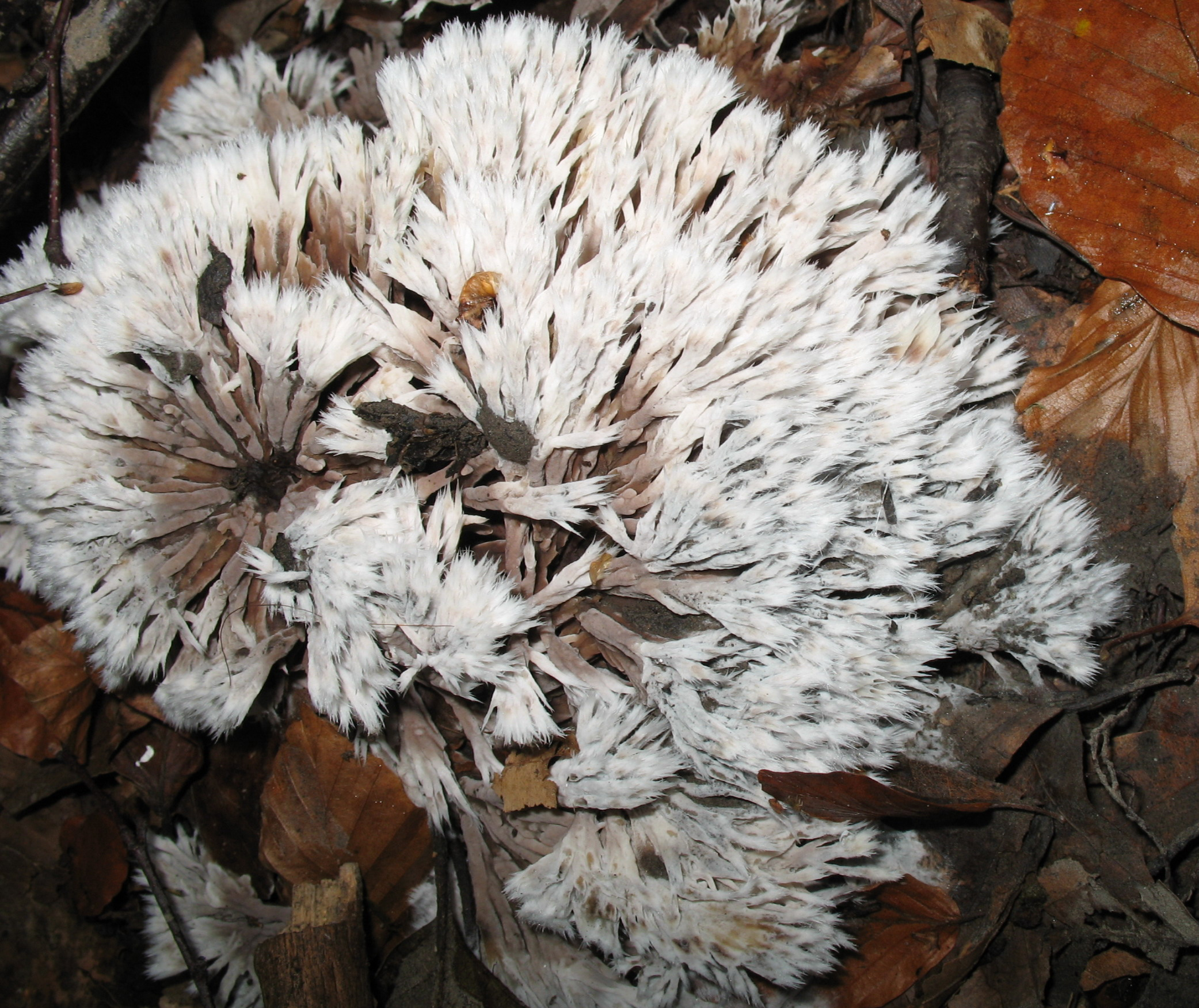

Scientific classification
- Domain: Eukaryota
- Kingdom: Fungi
- Division: Basidiomycota
- Class: Agaricomycetes
- Order: Thelephorales
- Family: Thelephoraceae
- Genus: Thelephora
- Species: T. penicillata

Binomial name
- Thelephora penicillata (Pers.) Fr. (1821)

Synonyms
- Phylacteria mollissima f. byssoideofimbriata Bourdot & Galzin (1772)

= Thelephora penicillata =

Species of fungus

Thelephora penicillata is a species of fungus.

== Distribution ==
Sometimes called the urchin earthfan in English, this ectomycorrhizal mushroom occurs mainly in western Europe an eastern North America, though scattered observations indicate it may occur in the right habitats worldwide.

== Habitat ==
The fungus is described as fairly common in wet, acidic conifer plantations with acidic soil throughout Britain and Ireland, though also sometimes found in mossy areas beneath broad-leaved trees. It appears from late summer to the end of autumn.

== As a hyperaccumulator ==
Thelephora penicillata has been found to accumulate in its fruiting bodies extraordinarily high concentrations of the elements cadmium, arsenic, copper and zinc fruit-bodies. It concentrates such high amounts of cadmium that it is regarded as a hyperaccumulator. In the environment, contact with too much cadmium can cause cadmium poisoning. Hyperaccumulators are receiving attention because of their possible use in bioremediation where environmental pollutants have reached dangerous levels.
