= Hypochnus ochroleucus =

Scientific classification
- Kingdom: Fungi
- Division: Basidiomycota
- Class: Agaricomycetes
- Order: Thelephorales
- Family: Thelephoraceae
- Genus: Hypochnus
- Species: H. ochroleucus

Binomial name
- Hypochnus ochroleucus (F. Noack) F. Noack

Synonyms
- Hypochnopsis ochroleucus F. Noack 1898

Species of fungus

Hypochnus ochroleucus is a fungal plant pathogen.
