= Cephalanthera austiniae =

Conservation status
- Apparently Secure (NatureServe)

Scientific classification
- Kingdom: Plantae
- Clade: Tracheophytes
- Clade: Angiosperms
- Clade: Monocots
- Order: Asparagales
- Family: Orchidaceae
- Subfamily: Epidendroideae
- Genus: Cephalanthera
- Species: C. austiniae

Binomial name
- Cephalanthera austiniae (A.Gray) Heller

Synonyms
- Chloraea austiniae A.Gray; Epipactis austiniae (A.Gray) Wettst.; Limodorum austiniae (A.Gray) Kuntze; Eburophyton austiniae (A.Gray) A.Heller; Serapias austiniae (A.Gray) A.A.Eaton; Cephalanthera oregana Rchb.f.; Chloraea oregana Nutt. ex Benth. & Hook.f.; Epipactis oregana (Rchb.f.) Wettst.; Limodorum oreganum (Rchb.f.) Kuntze

Species of flowering plant

Cephalanthera austiniae is a species of orchid known as the phantom orchid and snow orchid because the entire plant is white except for a few yellow markings on the flowers.

The orchid is native to the western United States (California, Oregon, Washington and Idaho), and to British Columbia, Canada. Cephalanthera austiniae is the only species of genus Cephalanthera native to the Western Hemisphere.

This is also the only Cephalanthera species entirely dependent on symbiotic mycorrhizae for its nutrition. This mycoheterotrophic orchid has no chlorophyll, so it makes no energy for itself.

== Description ==
Cephalanthera austiniae is a distinctive plant, rising from the dark, moist forest floor on waxy white stems and bearing orchid blossoms which are white or yellowish with yellow centers. Its leaves, if present, are rudimentary since such structures are not needed for collecting sunlight. Instead, this mycoheterotroph derives both its energy and nutrients from ectomycorrhizal fungi representing a variety of taxa within the Thelephoraceae

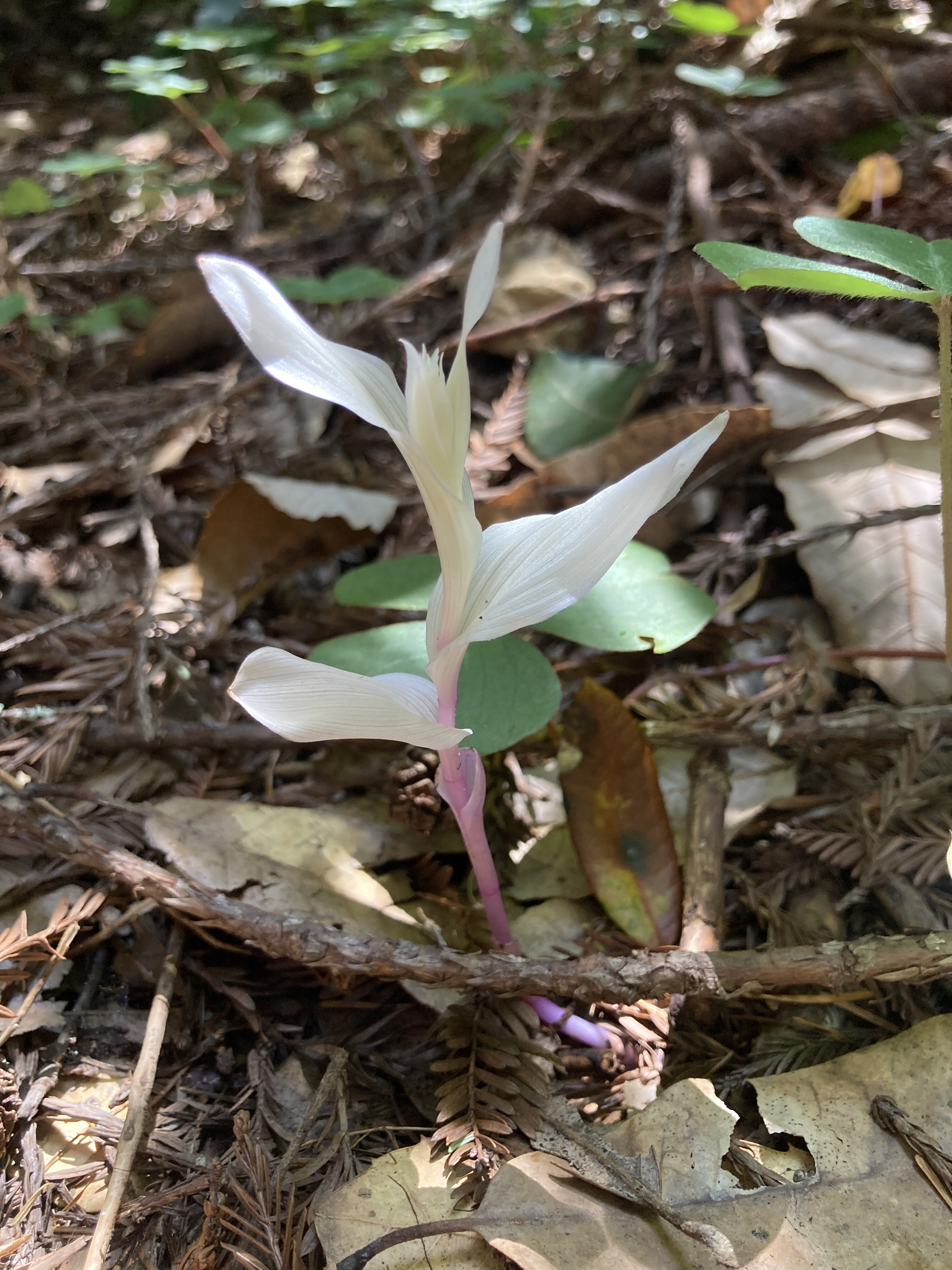
Early stage of growth of this orchid

== Conservation ==
The plant is becoming more scarce as its habitat—dense, isolated forest—becomes more rare. Climate change models forecast decline and possible extinction of this species by the year 2100 The plant is listed as apparently secure globally but endangered within its range in British Columbia.
