= Tomentellopsis rosannae =

Scientific classification
- Kingdom: Fungi
- Division: Basidiomycota
- Class: Agaricomycetes
- Order: Thelephorales
- Family: Thelephoraceae
- Genus: Tomentellopsis
- Species: T. rosannae

Binomial name
- Tomentellopsis rosannae Kuhar & Gresl.

Species of fungus

Tomentellopsis rosannae
- Mycological characteristics
- Smooth hymenium

Tomentellopsis rosannae is a species of fungus in the family Thelephoraceae within the order Thelephorales, native to Chile and Argentina.

== Taxonomy ==
The species was first described by Francisco Kuhar and Alina Greslebin in 2022, based on specimens from Puyehue National Park. The holotype is deposited in the Fungarium of the Florida Museum of Natural History, under the catalog number FLAS-F-65322.
