= Tetracladium =

Tetracladium may refer to:

- Tetracladium (fungus), a genus of fungi in the family Helotiaceae
- Tetracladium (flatworm), a genus of trematodes in the family Heterophyidae
- Tetracladium (plant), a genus of mosses in the family Thuidiaceae
