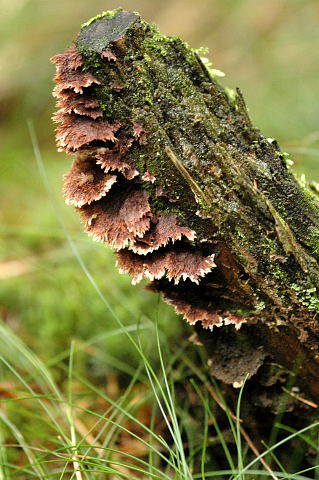
- Thelephora terrestris

Scientific classification
- Kingdom: Fungi
- Division: Basidiomycota
- Class: Agaricomycetes
- Order: Thelephorales
- Family: Thelephoraceae
- Genus: Thelephora; Ehrh. ex Willd. (1787)

Type species
- Thelephora terrestris Ehrh. (1787)

Synonyms
- Merisma Pers. (1797); Thelephora sect. Phylacteria Pers. (1822); Scyphopilus P.Karst. (1881); Phylacteria (Pers.) Pat. (1887); Thelophora Clem. (1902); Pseudothelephora Lloyd (1919)

= Thelephora =

Genus of fungi

Thelephora is a genus of fungi in the family Thelephoraceae. The genus has a widespread distribution and contains about 50 species. Fruit bodies of species are leathery, usually brownish at maturity, and range in shape from coral-like tufts to having distinct caps. Almost all species in the genus are thought to be inedible, but Thelephora ganbajun is a gourmet fungus in Yunnan province of southwest China.

The generic name is derived from the Greek thele (θηλή) meaning nipple and phorus meaning bearing. Species in the genus are commonly known as "fiber fans" and "fiber vases".

Some Thelephora species are known to accumulate or even hyperaccumulate trace elements in fruit-bodies. Thelephora penicillata hyperaccumulates cadmium and arsenic.

== Species ==
- T. albidobrunnea Schwein. 1832
- T. alta Corner 1968
- T. anthocephala (Bull.) Fr. 1838
- T. arbuscula Corner 1968
- T. atra Weinm. 1836
- T. atrocitrina Quél. 1875
- T. aurantiotincta Corner 1968
- T. borneensis Corner 1976
- T. bourdotiana Zecchin 2008
- T. brasiliensis (Rick) Rick 1959
- T. brunneoviolacea Beeli 1927
- T. caryophyllea (Schaeff.) Pers. 1801
- T. cerberea Corner 1966
- T. cervicornis Corner 1968
- T. cervina Corner 1968
- T. congesta Berk. 1872 – Australia
- T. crassitexta Corner 1968
- T. cuticularis Berk. 1847 – United States
- T. cylindrica Corner 1968
- T. dactylites Corner 1968
- T. dentosa Berk. & M.A.Curtis 1868
- T. erebia Corner 1968
- T. fragilis Ehrh. 1787
- T. friulana Zecchin 2003 – Italy
- T. fucoides Corner 1968
- T. fuscella (Ces.) Lloyd 1923
- T. ganbajun M.Zang 1987 – China
- T. gelidioides Corner 1968
- T. griseozonata Cooke 1891
- T. intybacea Pers. 1801
- T. investiens Corner 1968
- T. japonica Yasuda 1916
- T. lutosa Schwein. 1832
- T. magnifica Corner 1968
- T. multipartita Schwein. 1828
- T. palmata (Scop.) Fr. 1821
- T. paraguayensis Corner 1968
- T. pendens Corner 1968
- T. penicillata (Pers.) Fr. 1821
- T. phyllophoroides Corner 1968
- T. pseudoterrestris Corner 1968
- T. ramarioides D.A.Reid 1958
- T. robusta Corner 1976
- T. scissilis Burt 1914
- T. tenuis Burt 1931
- T. terrestris Ehrh. 1787
- T. undulata Schrad. ex J.F.Gmel. 1792
- T. vaga Berk. 1855
- T. vialis Schwein. 1832
- T. zeylanica Corner 1968
