= Urmas Kõljalg =

Estonian mycologist

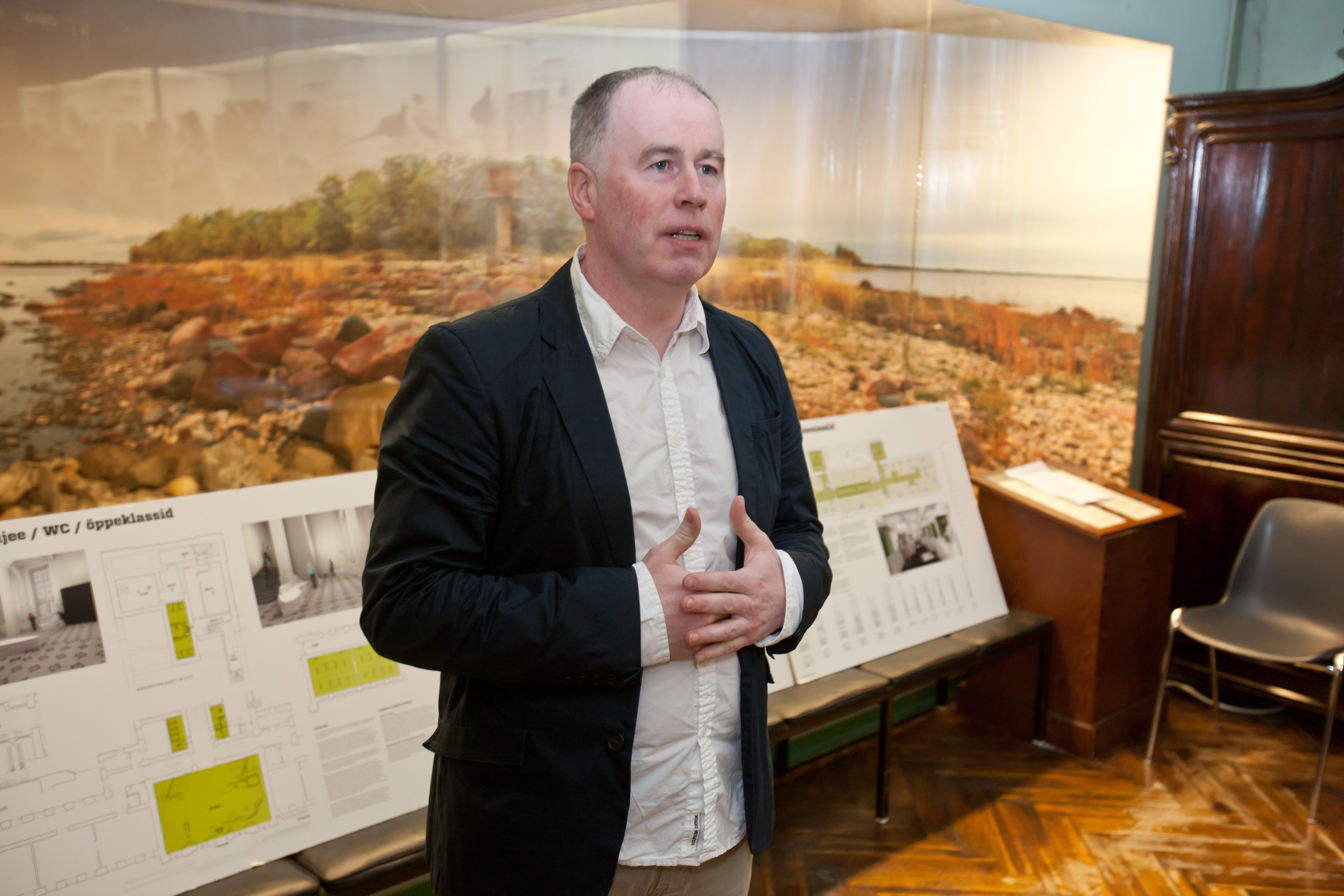
Urmas Kõljalg

Urmas Kõljalg (born 24 February 1961) is an Estonian biologist, mycologist and university professor.

He has recombined the following taxon:

- Amaurodon aeruginascens (Hjortstam & Ryvarden) Kõljalg & K.H. Larss.
