= Aquatic hyphomycetes =

Aquatic group of fungi

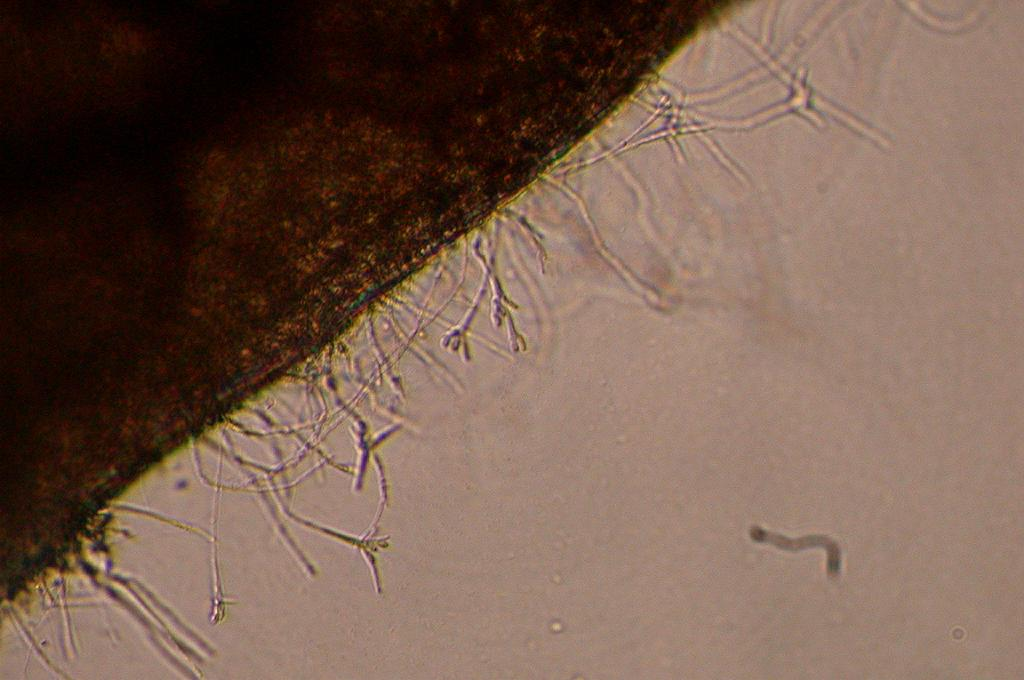
Tetracladium marchalianum conidia on conidiophores sticking out of a substrate.

Aquatic hyphomycetes (also known as Ingoldian fungi) are anamorphic (asexual) fungi that live in aquatic habitats and sporulate without sporocarps. This polyphyletic group of fungi is mostly classified based on their ecology and the morphology of their conidia. Most aquatic hyphomycetes are ascomycetes, but members from other groups are found as well, such as mitosporic basidiomycetes. Aquatic hyphomycetes belong to an asexual life stage of a fungus life cycle, and most of these species have not had their teleomorph (sexual) life stage identified. Due to recent phylogenetical studies, most of these species have been placed in the phyla Leotiomycota and Sordariomycota, within the orders Helotiales and Hypocreales.

There are over 300 described species of aquatic hyphomycetes.

== Ecology ==
Aquatic hyphomycetes live in aquatic habitats, most known from well-aereated freshwater streams on leaf litter and other decaying plant material, but are also found in ponds, lakes, estuarine and marine environments. They are primarily saprotrophs, and break down leaves, or other plant material, together with bacteria, and other organisms such as oomycetes. Aquatic hyphomycetes are primarily found as decomposers in aquatic habitats, and this decomposition makes nutrients available for other organisms. They are often attributed for facilitating for other organisms—for example for groups like benthic insects eating leaves that are partly decomposed, or "conditioned" by fungi and bacteria. Some species have also been observed as being endophytes in the roots of riparian plant species, and other species are observed to be mycoparasites. Aquatic hyphomycetes play a bigger role in nutrient cycles when making difficult-to-break-down molecules, like cellulose and lignin, making nutrients like nitrogen available for other organisms, such as insects and fish.

Aquatic hyphomycetes are also considered important bioindicators of ecosystem health, because many of these species are sensitive to stress factors in the environment, like pollutants or temperature. However, many of these species have also been found to be very resistant to these kinds of stressors. Aquatic hyphomycetes could therefore be used as a bioindicator of ecosystem health by managements around the world.

Historically, many species have gotten their own Latin names—even without their teleomorphic phase being known. However, in more recent times, some species have gotten their teleomorphic phase identified via molecular methods.

== History ==
The first aquatic hyphomycete that is in this ecological group that was described has often been attributed to being Heliscus lugdunensis (Neonectria lugdunensis), described by Pier Andrea Saccardo and Jean-Jacques Therry, indexed andpublished by Saccardo in 1880. Though the earliest description of a species in this group is likely Trinacrium subtile, which was described by Heinrich Riess in 1852. The second person attributed to recognize and describe three species from this group was Émile De Wildeman in the 1890s. However, the first mycologist to recognize and describe the whole ecological group in their environment, was Cecil Terence Ingold in 1942, where he described many species from decaying alder leaves in a stream in England. Since then hyphomycetes have been observed from all around the world. Many species were long thought to be cosmopolitan, but recent phylogeny on biogeography of species seem to counteract this thought.

== Identification ==
Identification of these species is based mainly on spore morphology. Spores usually have tetraradiate, scolecoid, or filamentous shapes. Some important characters for identification include: number, and placement of septa; branches; constrictions at the septa; spiny tips of branches; length and width of branches, with more. The hyphae extends a conidiophore from the substrate and develops a conidia that breaks off into the stream, to find a new substrate, attach, and germinate. These spore morphologies are believed to be specialized to survive in stream environments, and attach to specific substrata, which gives them their shapes. For many species the spore morphology is not enough, however, and the structure of the conidiophore is required. This is most often done by getting the fungi to grow in cultures, and then inspecting the spore-producing structures.

=== Key characters often used when identifying aquatic hyphomycetes ===
- Amount of elements in the conidium.
- Constrictions at the bases of secondary or tertiary elements.
- Scar location and form.
- Shapes of the endings of elements.
- Shapes, and measurements of the elements.
- Amount of septa.
- Curvature of main axis.
