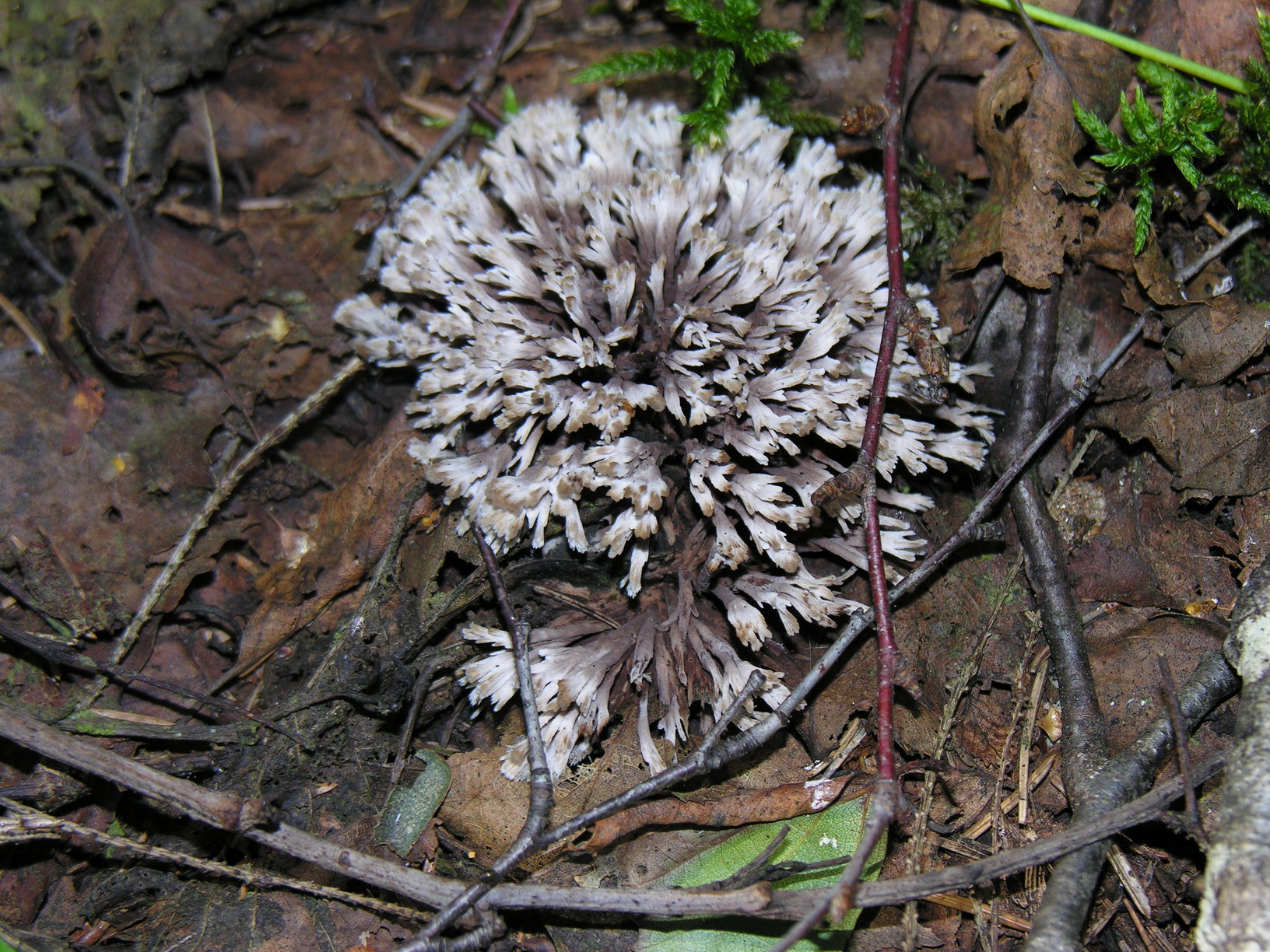

Scientific classification
- Domain: Eukaryota
- Kingdom: Fungi
- Division: Basidiomycota
- Class: Agaricomycetes
- Order: Thelephorales
- Family: Thelephoraceae
- Genus: Thelephora
- Species: T. anthocephala

Binomial name
- Thelephora anthocephala (Bull.) Fr. (1838)

Synonyms
- Clavaria anthocephala Bull. (1786)

= Thelephora anthocephala =

Species of fungus

Thelephora anthocephala is a species of coral fungus in the family Thelephoraceae. It was originally described as new to science in 1786 by French botanist Jean Baptiste François Pierre Bulliard, who placed it in the genus Clavaria. Elias Fries transferred it to Thelephora in his 1838 work Epicrisis Systematis Mycologici.
