= Skepperia =

Scientific classification
- Kingdom: Fungi
- Division: Basidiomycota
- Class: Agaricomycetes
- Order: Thelephorales
- Family: Thelephoraceae
- Genus: Skepperia; Berk. (1857)

Type species
- Skepperia convoluta Berk. (1857)

Genus of fungi

Skepperia is a genus of fungi in the family Thelephoraceae. The genus was described by mycologist Miles Joseph Berkeley in 1857 to contain the type species Skepperia convoluta. The genus was circumscribed by Berkeley in Trans. Linn. Soc. London vol.22 on page 130 in 1857.

The genus name of Skepperia is in honour of Edmund Skepper (1825–1867), who was a British botanist and chemist.

== Distribution ==
It is only recorded as being found in a few places worldwide, America and New Zealand.

== Species ==
As accepted by Species Fungorum;

- Skepperia andina Pat. (1893)
- Skepperia convoluta Berk. (1857)
- Skepperia platensis (Speg.) Pat. (1897)
- Skepperia zeylanica Petch (1917)

Former species;

- S. carpatica Pilát (1927) = Cotylidia carpatica, Rickenellaceae family
- S. spathularia (Berk. & M.A. Curtis) Pat. (1899) = Skepperiella spathularia Agaricales order
