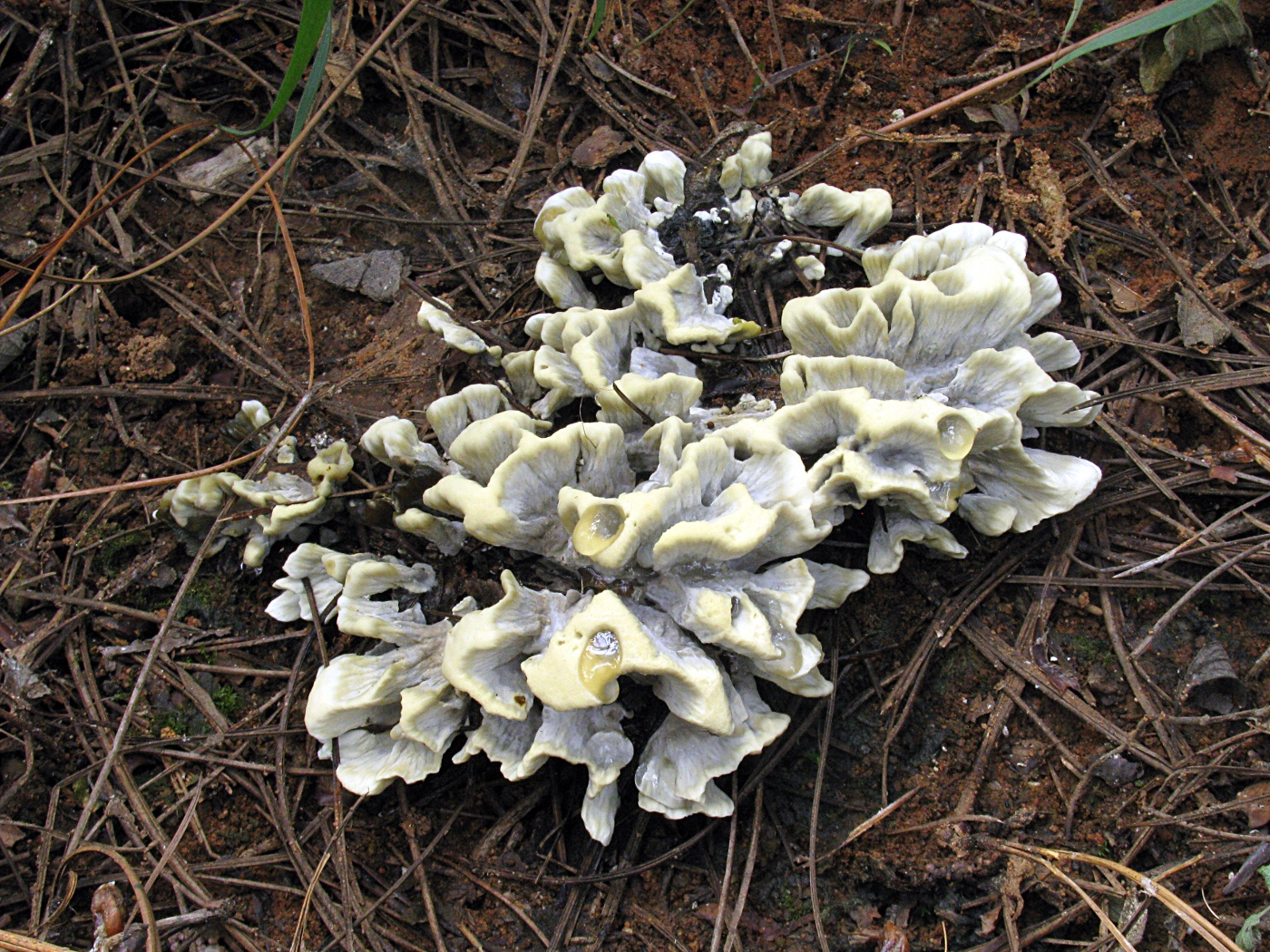
- Thelephora ganbajun, found in Huaning, Yunnan, China

Scientific classification
- Kingdom: Fungi
- Division: Basidiomycota
- Class: Agaricomycetes
- Order: Thelephorales
- Family: Thelephoraceae
- Genus: Thelephora
- Species: T. ganbajun

Binomial name
- Thelephora ganbajun M.Zang (1987)

= Thelephora ganbajun =

Species of fungus

Thelephora ganbajun, or ganba fungus (simplified Chinese: 干巴菌; traditional Chinese: 乾巴菌; pinyin: Gānbajùn; lit. 'dry stuff fungus'), is a species of coral fungus in the family Thelephoraceae. It was first described in 1987 by Chinese mycologist Mu Zang, based on specimens collected in Yunnan, China.

== Description ==
Thelephora ganbajun is annual, has a clustered, coral-like fruiting bodies which is 5-14cm in height and 4-14cm in width. Branching repeatedly from a thick, ringed base, with narrow, fan-shaped or broom-like tips extending from the upper portions. The coloration ranging from greyish white to greyish black. Young fruiting bodies are soft in texture, becoming dry and tough upon maturity.

Under microscopic examination, the basidiospores are 7–12 × 6–8 μm, which are angular and echinulate, hyaline to pale brown, and non-amyloid. Basidia measure 25–35 × 9–12 μm, with 3–8 μm long sterigmata. Hyphae are hyaline with clamp connections.

The flesh is thick and fibrous, with a pleasant odor and taste, this species is considered edible.

== Habitat and distribution ==
Thelephora ganbajun is an ectomycorrhizal fungus, forming associations with Pinus yunnanensis, Pinus massoniana, and Pinus kesiya var. langbianensis. It grows in pine forests at elevations between 800 and 2200 meters.

Fruiting bodies emerge between June and October. Mycelial growth occurs optimally at 22-30 °C and does not require light, whereas fruiting body development requires some illumination and occurs at 14–24 °C, with optimal soil moisture around 60% and relative humidity of 80–90%.

The species is endemic to China, primarily distributed in Yunnan Province, with scattered records from western Guizhou and southern Sichuan.

== Artificial cultivation ==
Artificial cultivation of Thelephora ganbajun has not yet been achieved, due to the poorly understood mycorrhizal symbiosis, difficulties in isolating and propagating fruiting body tissue, and the optimization of liquid culture conditions.

Commercial supply therefore remains entirely dependent on wild harvesting.

== Genetic diversity ==
A study of 156 specimens from nine regions in Yunnan Province identified 34 ITS haplotypes grouped into five phylogenetic clades, with divergence levels comparable to or greater than known sister species pairs within Thelephora. Despite evidence of gene flow among populations, low but significant genetic differentiation was detected across local and regional populations.

Phylogenetic analyses based on ITS, nLSU, and mtSSU loci have identified four closely related species: Thelephora aquila, Thelephora glaucoflora, Thelephora nebula, and Thelephora pseudoganbajun, which form a well supported clade with Thelephora ganbajun.
