= Lenzitopsis =

Scientific classification
- Domain: Eukaryota
- Kingdom: Fungi
- Division: Basidiomycota
- Class: Agaricomycetes
- Order: Thelephorales
- Family: Thelephoraceae
- Genus: Lenzitopsis; Malençon & Bertault (1963)

Type species
- Lenzitopsis oxycedri Malençon & Bertault (1963)

Species
- Lenzitopsis daii Lenzitopsis oxycedri

Synonyms
- Lenzitella Ryvarden (1991)

Genus of fungi

Lenzitopsis is a genus of fungi in the family Thelephoraceae. This genus contains two species, the type Lenzitopsis oxycedri and L. daii, described as new to science in 2012.

The genus name of Lenzitopsis is in honour of Harald Othmar Lenz (1798–1870), who was a German naturalist from Thüringen.
