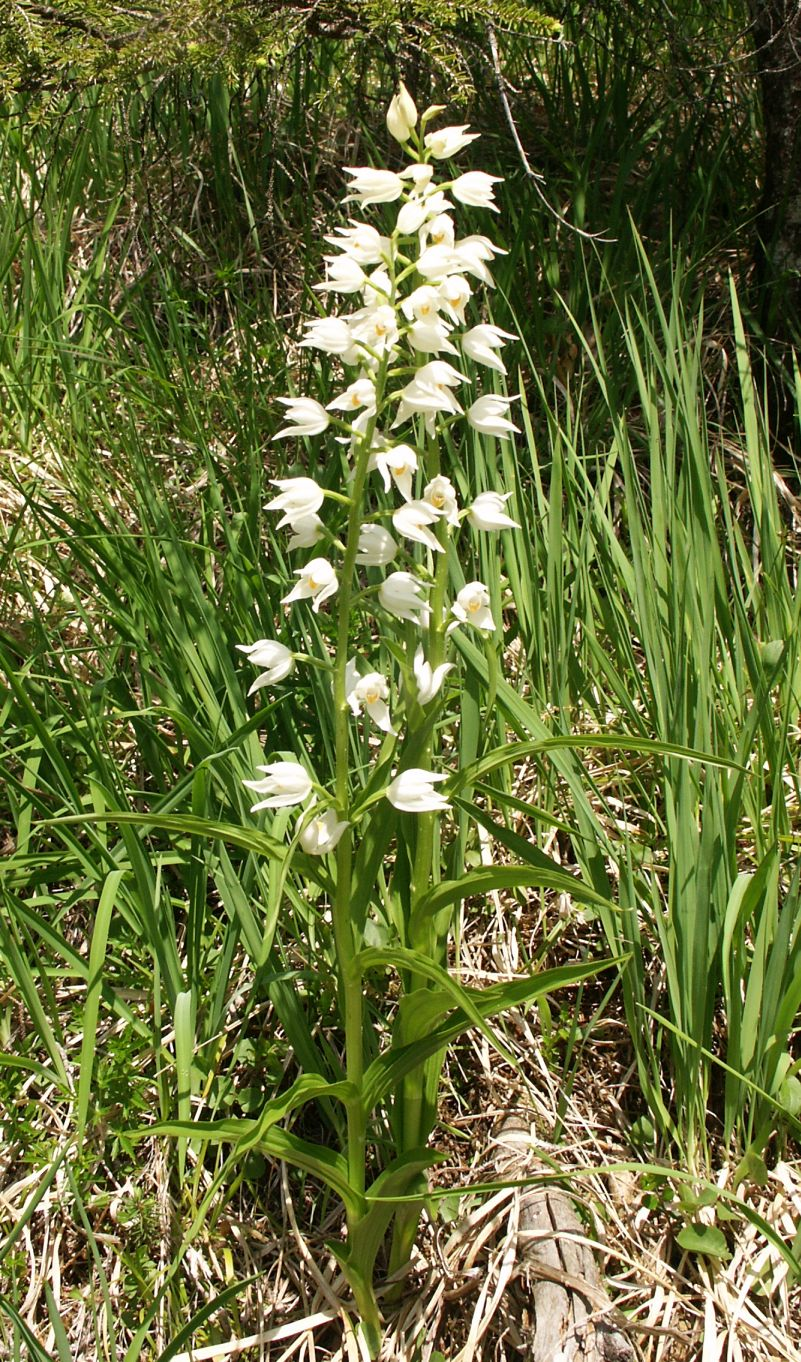
- Sword-leaved helleborine, (Cephalanthera longifolia)

Scientific classification
- Kingdom: Plantae
- Clade: Tracheophytes
- Clade: Angiosperms
- Clade: Monocots
- Order: Asparagales
- Family: Orchidaceae
- Subfamily: Epidendroideae
- Tribe: Neottieae
- Genus: Cephalanthera; Rich.

Type species
- Cephalanthera damasonium (Mill.) Druce

Synonyms
- Callithronum Ehrh.; Lonchophyllum Ehrh.; Xiphophyllum Ehrh.; Dorycheile Rchb.; Eburophyton A.Heller; Tangtsinia S.C.Chen

= Cephalanthera =

Genus of orchids

Cephalanthera, abbreviated Ceph in horticultural trade, is a genus of mostly terrestrial orchids. Members of this genus have rhizomes rather than tubers. About 15 species are currently recognized, most of them native to Europe and Asia. The only species found in the wild in North America is Cephalanthera austiniae, the phantom orchid or snow orchid. Ecologically, this species is partially myco-heterotrophic. Some of the Eurasian species hybridise.

Several of the European species have common names including the word "helleborine", though orchids in other genera are also called helleborines. In addition to those listed here, very large numbers of other specific names will be found in the older literature, but these are almost all synonyms for the best known species such as C. longifolia or C. damasonium, the European white helleborine.

Species accepted as of May 2014 are:

- Cephalanthera alpicola Fukuy. - Taiwan
- Cephalanthera austiniae (A.Gry) Heller - British Columbia, Washington, Oregon, Idaho, California
- Cephalanthera calcarata Chen & Lang - Yunnan
- Cephalanthera caucasica Krzl. - Iran, southern European Russia, Azerbaijan, Armenia, Republic of Georgia
- Cephalanthera cucullata Boiss. & Heldr. - Crete
- Cephalanthera damasonium (Mill.) Druce - Europe and the Middle East from England and Sweden to Russia and Iran; also Bhutan, India, Myanmar and Yunnan
- Cephalanthera epipactoides Fischer & C. A. Meyer - Bulgaria, Greece, Turkey
- Cephalanthera erecta (Thunb.) Blume - China, Japan, Korea, Kuril Islands, Bhutan, Assam, eastern Himalayas
- Cephalanthera ericiflora Szlach. & Mytnik - Laos
- Cephalanthera exigua Seidenf. - Laos, Thailand
- Cephalanthera falcata (Thunb.) Blume - China, Japan, Korea
- Cephalanthera gracilis S.C.Chen & G.H.Zhu - Yunnan
- Cephalanthera humilis X.H.Jin - Yunnan
- Cephalanthera kotschyana Renz & Taub. - Turkey, Azerbaijan, Armenia, Republic of Georgia
- Cephalanthera kurdica Bornm. ex Kraenzl. - Turkey, Azerbaijan, Armenia, Republic of Georgia, Iran, Iraq, southern European Russia
- Cephalanthera longibracteata Blume - China, Japan, Korea, Russian Far East
- Cephalanthera longifolia (L.) Fritsch - widespread across Europe, Asia and north Africa from Ireland and Morocco to China
- Cephalanthera × mayeri (E.Mayer & Zimmerm.) A.Camus in E.G.Camus & A.A.Camus - Germany (C. damasonium × C. rubra)
- Cephalanthera nanchuanica (S.C.Chen) X.H.Jin & X.G.Xiang - Sichuan
- Cephalanthera × otto-hechtii G.Keller in G.Keller & al. - Austria, Switzerland (C. longifolia × C. rubra)
- Cephalanthera pusilla (Hook.f.) Seidenf. - Myanmar, China
- Cephalanthera × renzii B.Baumann & al.. - Azerbaijan (C. caucasica × C. longifolia)
- Cephalanthera rubra (L.) Rich. - Europe, North Africa and southwest Asia from England, Spain and Morocco to Russia and Iran
- Cephalanthera × schaberi Baum. - European Turkey (C. epipactoides × C. longifolia)
- Cephalanthera × schulzei E.G.Camus in E.G.Camus, P.Bergon & A.A.Camus - Austria, Germany, France, Turkey, the former Yugoslavia (C. damasonium × C. longifolia)
- Cephalanthera × taubenheimii H.Baumann - Turkey (C. damasonium × C. kotschyana)
