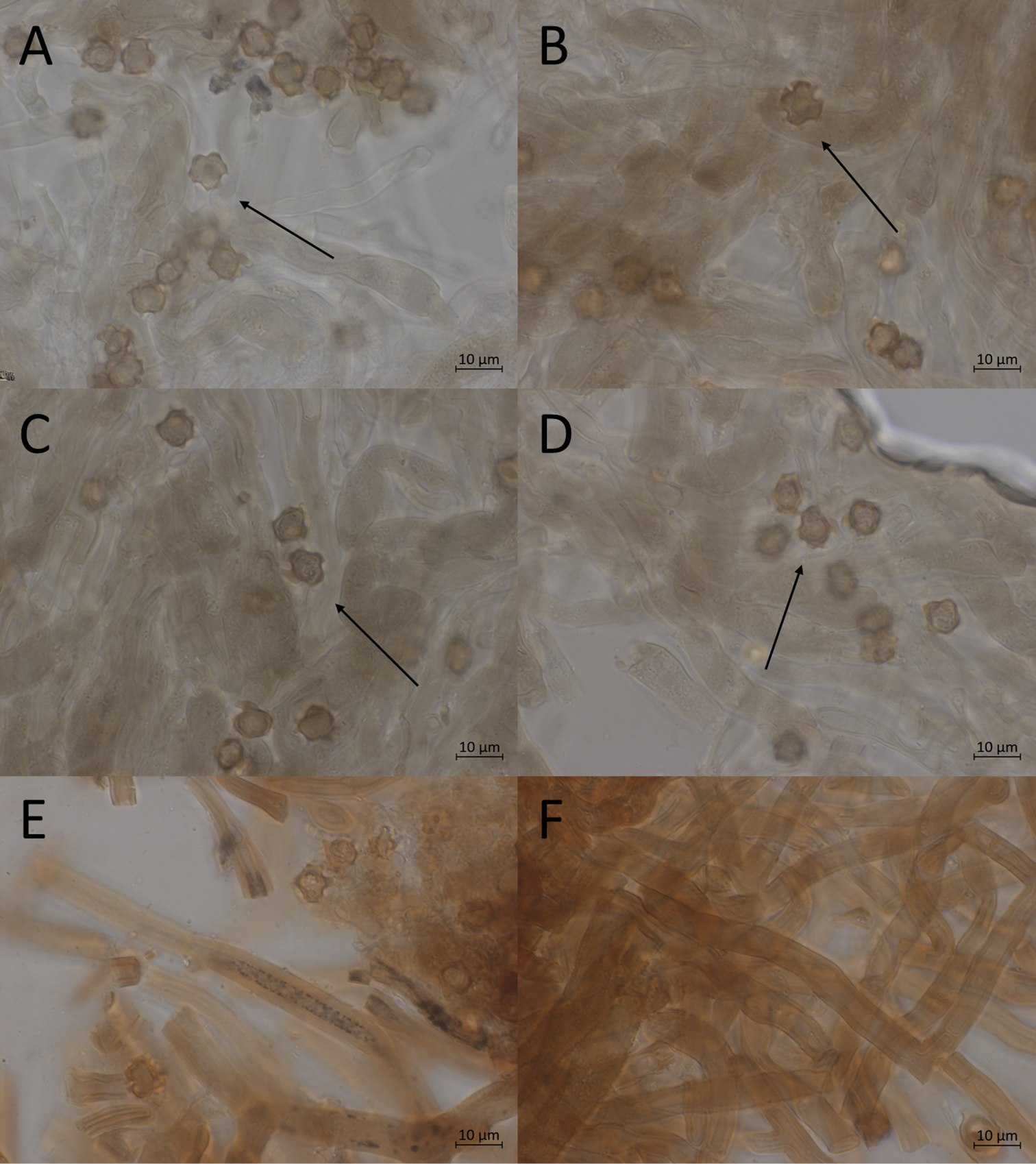
- Micromorphological features of Hypochnus rhacodium in KOH. Syntype: A, B basidiospores in frontal face C, D in lateral face E subicular hyphae with granulation and F without

Scientific classification
- Kingdom: Fungi
- Division: Basidiomycota
- Class: Agaricomycetes
- Order: Thelephorales
- Family: Thelephoraceae
- Genus: Hypochnus; Fr. (1818)

Synonyms
- Hypochnopsis Fr. (1818)

= Hypochnus =

Genus of fungi

Hypochnus is a genus of fungi. The original treatment of the genus by Elias Magnus Fries included various wholly unrelated species, therefore it is now considered a nomen ambiguum, with the type species H. ferrugineus assigned to Tomentella.

== Species ==
- Hypochnus anthochrous ((Pers: Fr) Fr, 1863)
- Hypochnus chlorinus (Massee, 1901)
- Hypochnus cinerascens (P.Karst, 1888)
- Hypochnus cucumeris (A.B.Frank, 1883)
- Hypochnus ferrugineus
- Hypochnus fuciformis (McAlpine, 1906)
- Hypochnus fuscus
- Hypochnus fusisporus (J.Schrot., 1888)
- Hypochnus ochroleucus (Noack, 1898) – a plant pathogen
- Hypochnus olivaceus (Fr. : Fr., 1828)
- Hypochnus rhacodium Berk. & M.A. Curtis ex Burt 1926
