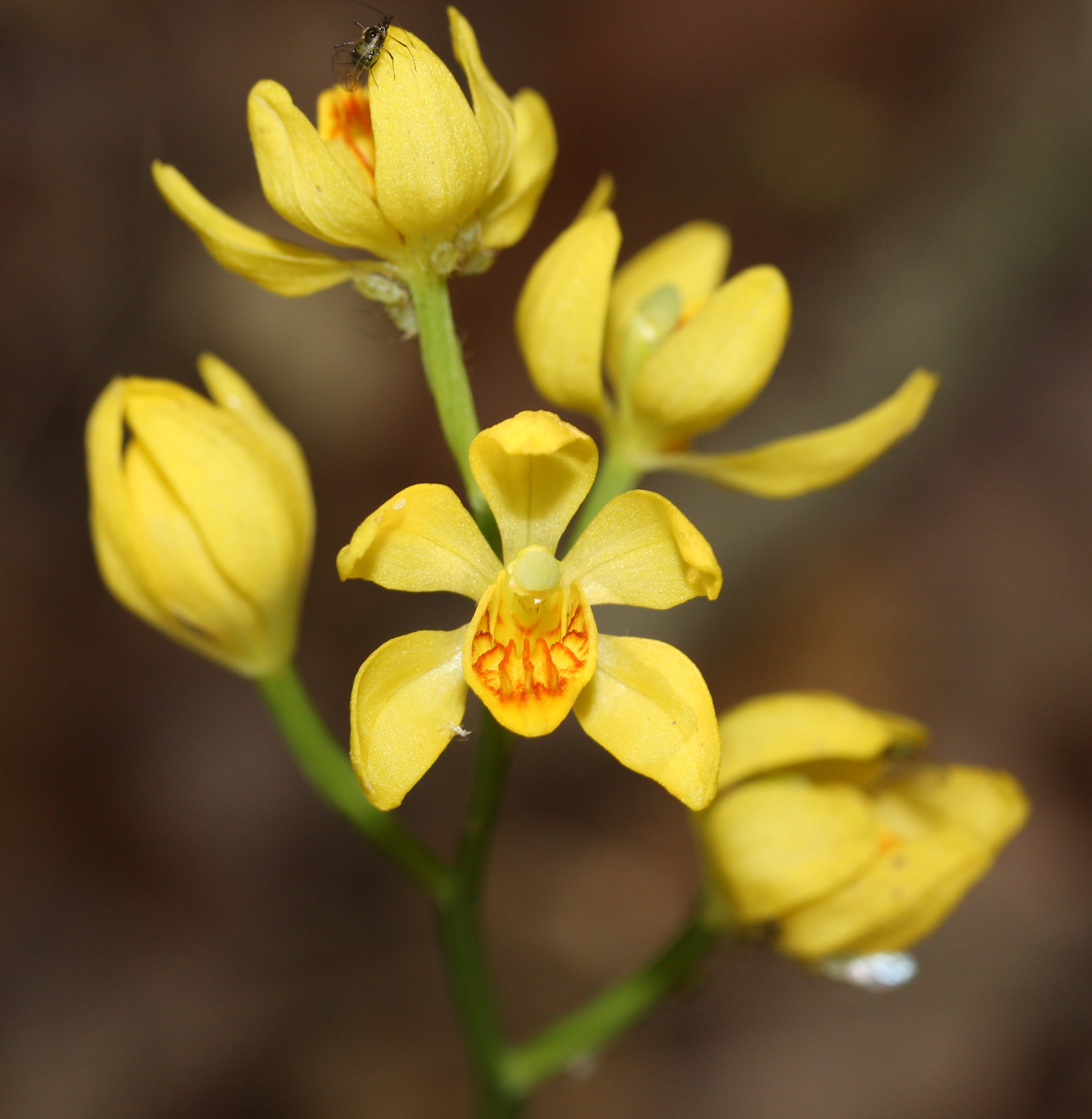

Scientific classification
- Kingdom: Plantae
- Clade: Tracheophytes
- Clade: Angiosperms
- Clade: Monocots
- Order: Asparagales
- Family: Orchidaceae
- Subfamily: Epidendroideae
- Genus: Cephalanthera
- Species: C. falcata

Binomial name
- Cephalanthera falcata (Thunb.) Blume (1859)

Synonyms
- Serapias falcata Thunb. (1784) (Basionym); Cymbidium falcatum (Thunb.) Sw. (1799); Epipactis falcata (Thunb.) Sw. (1805); Pelexia falcata (Thunb.) Spreng. (1826); Pelexia japonica Spreng. (1826); Cephalanthera platycheila Rchb.f. (1845); Cephalanthera japonica A.Gray (1857); Limodorum falcatum (Thunb.) Kuntze (1891); Cephalanthera raymondiae Schltr. (1922); Cephalanthera bijiangensis S.C.Chen (1987); Cephalanthera falcata var. flava X.H.Jin & S.C.Chen (2009)

= Cephalanthera falcata =

Golden orchid

Species of orchid

Cephalanthera falcata, the golden orchid, is a species of orchid. It is native to Japan, Korea, and China (Anhui, Fujian, Guangdong, Guangxi, Guizhou, Hubei, Hunan, Jiangsu, Jiangxi, Sichuan, Yunnan).
