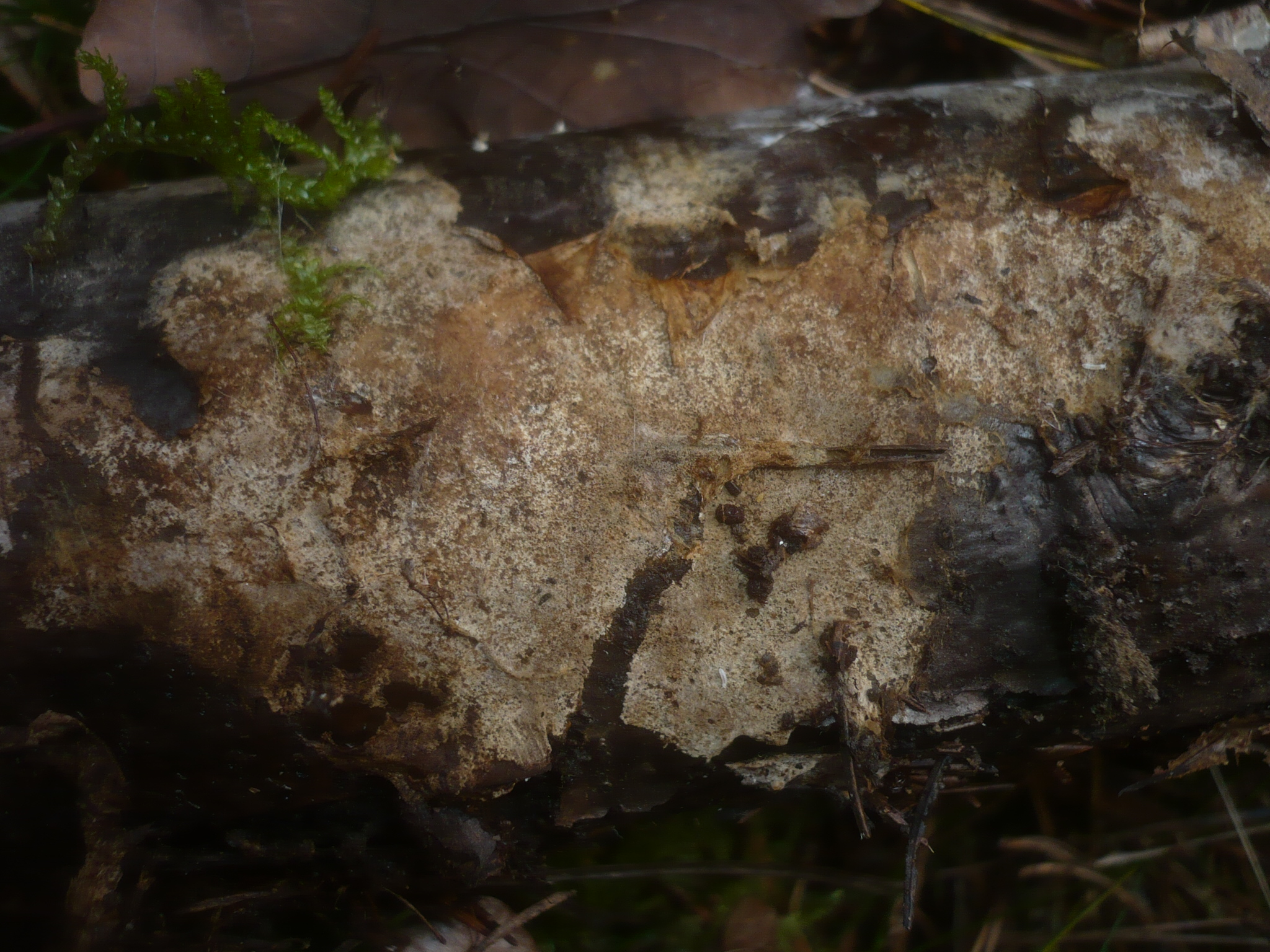
- Pseudotomentella mucidula

Scientific classification
- Kingdom: Fungi
- Division: Basidiomycota
- Class: Agaricomycetes
- Order: Thelephorales
- Family: Thelephoraceae
- Genus: Pseudotomentella; Svrček (1958)

Type species
- Pseudotomentella mucidula (P.Karst.) Svrček (1958)

= Pseudotomentella =

Genus of fungi

Pseudotomentella is a genus of corticioid fungi in the family Thelephoraceae. The genus was described by Czech mycologist Mirko Svrček in 1958.

== Species ==
1. P. armata
2. P. atrofusca
3. P. flavovirens
4. P. griseopergamacea
5. P. humicola
6. P. larsenii
7. P. longisterigmata
8. P. molybdea
9. P. mucidula
10. P. nigra
11. P. ochracea
12. P. rhizopunctata
13. P. tenebrosa
14. P. tristis
15. P. vepallidospora
16. P. verrucispora
17. P. viridiflava
