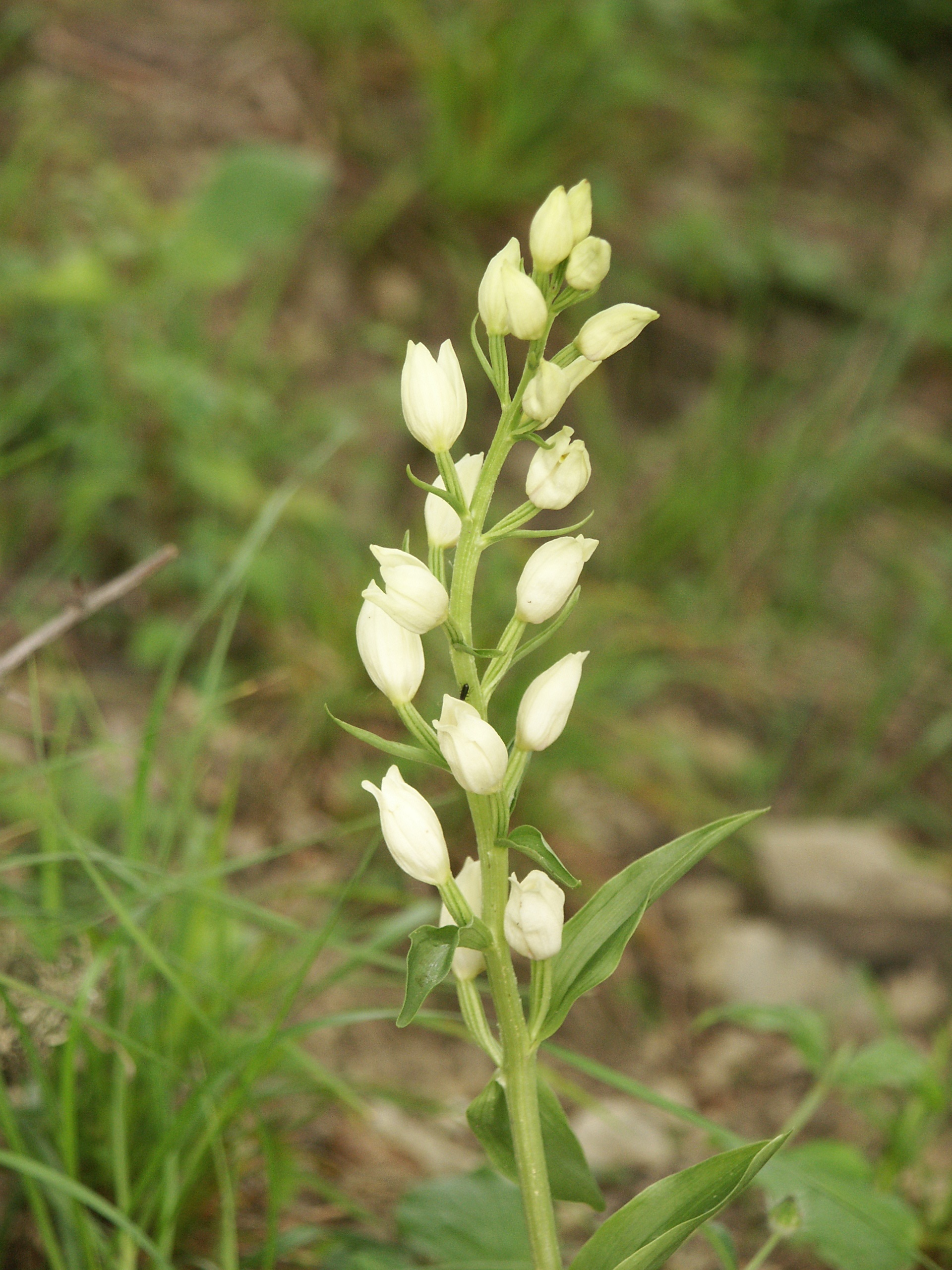

Scientific classification
- Kingdom: Plantae
- Clade: Tracheophytes
- Clade: Angiosperms
- Clade: Monocots
- Order: Asparagales
- Family: Orchidaceae
- Subfamily: Epidendroideae
- Genus: Cephalanthera
- Species: C. damasonium

Binomial name
- Cephalanthera damasonium (Mill.) Druce (1906)

Synonyms
- Serapias damasonium Mill. (1768) (Basionym); Cephalanthera acuminata Ledeb. (1852); Cephalanthera alba (Crantz) Simonk. (1887); Cephalanthera damasonium lusus ochroleuca (Baumg.) Soó (1970); Cephalanthera lancifolia (F.W. Schmidt) Dumort. (1827); Cephalanthera latifolia Janch. (1907); Cephalanthera ochroleuca (Baumg.) Rchb. (1831); Cephalanthera yunnanensis Hand.-Mazz. (1936); Cymbidium pallens Sw. (1799); Epipactis alba Crantz (1769); Epipactis lancifolia F.W. Schmidt (1795); Epipactis ochroleuca Baumg. (1817); Serapias alba (Crantz) Salisb. (1796); Serapias grandiflora Oeder (1770); Serapias lancifolia (F.W. Schmidt) Roth (1799); Serapias latifolia Mill. (1768); Serapias ochroleuca (Baumg.) Steud. (1821); Serapias pallens (Sw.) S.B. Jundz. (1830); Serapias tota-alba Gilib. (1792)

= Cephalanthera damasonium =

White helleborine

Species of orchid

Cephalanthera damasonium, the white helleborine, is a species of orchid. It is widespread across much of Europe and Asia. Cephalanthera damasonium is the type species of the genus Cephalanthera.

== Description ==
Cephalanthera damasonium is a herbaceous plant, reaching a maximum height of about 60 cm. Leaves are ovate, becoming narrower higher up the stem, with parallel venation. It has white flowers which never fully open. Each shoot can carry up to 16 flowers. Across its range this species flowers May–June. It is a perennial species which tends not to spread vegetatively.

This species is differentiated from the similar and closely related Cephalanthera longifolia, by comparing the leaves. The rarer Cephalanthera longifolia has longer, narrower leaves.

== Distribution and habitat ==
Found in shady lowland forest with little undergrowth, especially under beech trees, occasionally spreads onto chalk scrub. Can colonise new beech forest quite quickly. Requires a well-drained soil above chalk or oolitic limestone.

This species is found in Europe from England and Sweden to Russia and Iran; also Bhutan, India, Myanmar and Yunnan.

== Ecology ==
The flowers of this species hardly open, because they are autogamous (self-pollinating). Before anthesis, the opening of the flower, the anther opens and the pollinia directly sink onto the stigmatic surface. Then pollen tubes start growing. This pollination mode enables the white helleborine to grow in deep shade, where the pollinators are almost absent.

Cephalanthera damasonium has been indicated to be a mycorrhizal generalist. A 2017 investigation found that in Italy mycorrhizal associations are formed with Agaricomycetes, Ascomycota, Cadaphora luteo-olivacea, Cenococcum geophilum, Ceratobasidium including C. cornigerum, Cryptococcus carnescens, Exophiala salmonis, Hymenogastraceae including Hymenogaser cytrinus and H. bulliardii., Pezizomycetes, Sebacina sp. and Tetracladium furcatum.

It has been suggested that the presence of this orchid species in a woodland is an indicator that edible truffles can be found there, but this is not always the case.

== Conservation ==
Globally, the conservation status of this species is vulnerable. In the United Kingdom this species is abundant but declining, and mainly a southern English species.

== Etymology ==
Cephalanthera comes from the Greek κεφαλή ανθηρός, meaning "head flowering", thought to be a reference to the protruding position of the anthers. The species epithet damasonium also comes from Ancient Greek and means 'I take away/diminish', possibly referring to a medical use for the plant.

"Helleborine" may refer to deer using the orchid for food (many conservationists have noted that helleborine orchids are grazed by deer). Alternatively it may denote that the plants are similar to hellebores (a group of species in the family Ranunculaceae). "Hellebore" comes from the Greek "álkē" and "bora", translating as "fawn" and "food of beasts".

== Literature ==
- Claessens, J. & J. Kleynen: The flower of the European Orchid – Form and function, 2011. ISBN 978-90-9025556-9.
- Media related to White Helleborine (Cephalanthera damasonium) at Wikimedia Commons
- Data related to White Helleborine (Cephalanthera damasonium) at Wikispecies
