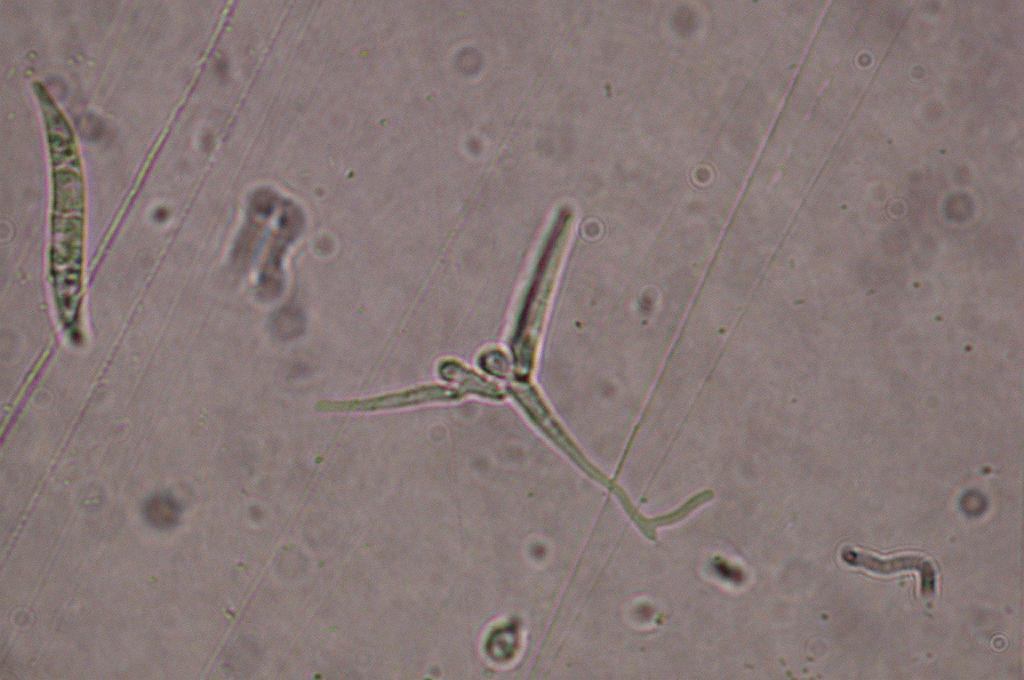

Scientific classification
- Kingdom: Fungi
- Division: Ascomycota
- Class: Leotiomycetes
- Order: Helotiales
- Family: Helotiaceae
- Genus: Tetracladium; De Wild.

= Tetracladium (fungus) =

Genus of fungi

Tetracladium is a genus of fungi belonging to the order Helotiales. The genus is part of an anamorphic group called aquatic hyphomycetes that is found in aquatic environments including freshwater streams, ponds, and estuaries, but have also been found in other various habitats, including in terrestrial soil and decaying plant matter in terrestrial environments.

== Etymology ==
The genus name "Tetracladium" derives from the Greek words "tetra," meaning four, and "cladion," meaning branch, referring to the typical branching pattern observed in the conidia of these fungi.

== Distribution and Ecology ==
Tetracladium species can be found in a wide range of environments, including freshwater and terrestrial ecosystems. They are often associated with decaying organic matter such as submerged wood, leaf litter, and other plant debris. Tetracladium species play a crucial role in nutrient cycling, particularly in the decomposition of organic material. By participating in the decomposition process, Tetracladium species contribute to the recycling of nutrients, which are then made available to other organisms, such as benthic insects eating leaves. Their distribution is global, with species being reported from diverse locations including temperate, and polar habitats.

Tetracladium engage in various ecological interactions with other organisms. Some form mutualistic relationships with certain riparian plants as endophytes. These fungi can also interact with bacteria and other fungi in complex microbial communities associated with decomposing organic matter.

== Taxonomy ==
The genus Tetracladium was first described by DeWildeman in 1893, together with the type species Tetracladium marchalianum. Initially, up until the turn of the 20th century, nine different aquatic species were distinguished based on the morphological characteristics of their spores. They have distinct, tetraradiate conidia with central globose cells. Some Tetracladium species seem to have lost their teleomorphic (sexual) phases. Many of the described species are differentiated from each other based on morphological or developmental differences.

Tetracladium is placed within the Han Clade 9/Stamnaria lineage/Vandijckellaceae clade. The genus comprises several species described from aquatic and terrestrial environments, identified using DNA sequencing and morphological characteristics.

=== Species ===
- Tetracladium apiense
- Tetracladium breve
- Tetracladium ellipsoideum
- Tetracladium fraxineum
- Tetracladium furcatum
- Tetracladium globosum
- Tetracladium marchalianum
- Tetracladium maxilliforme
- Tetracladium nainitalense
- Tetracladium palmatum
- Tetracladium psychrophilum
- Tetracladium setigerum
- Tetracladium singulare
