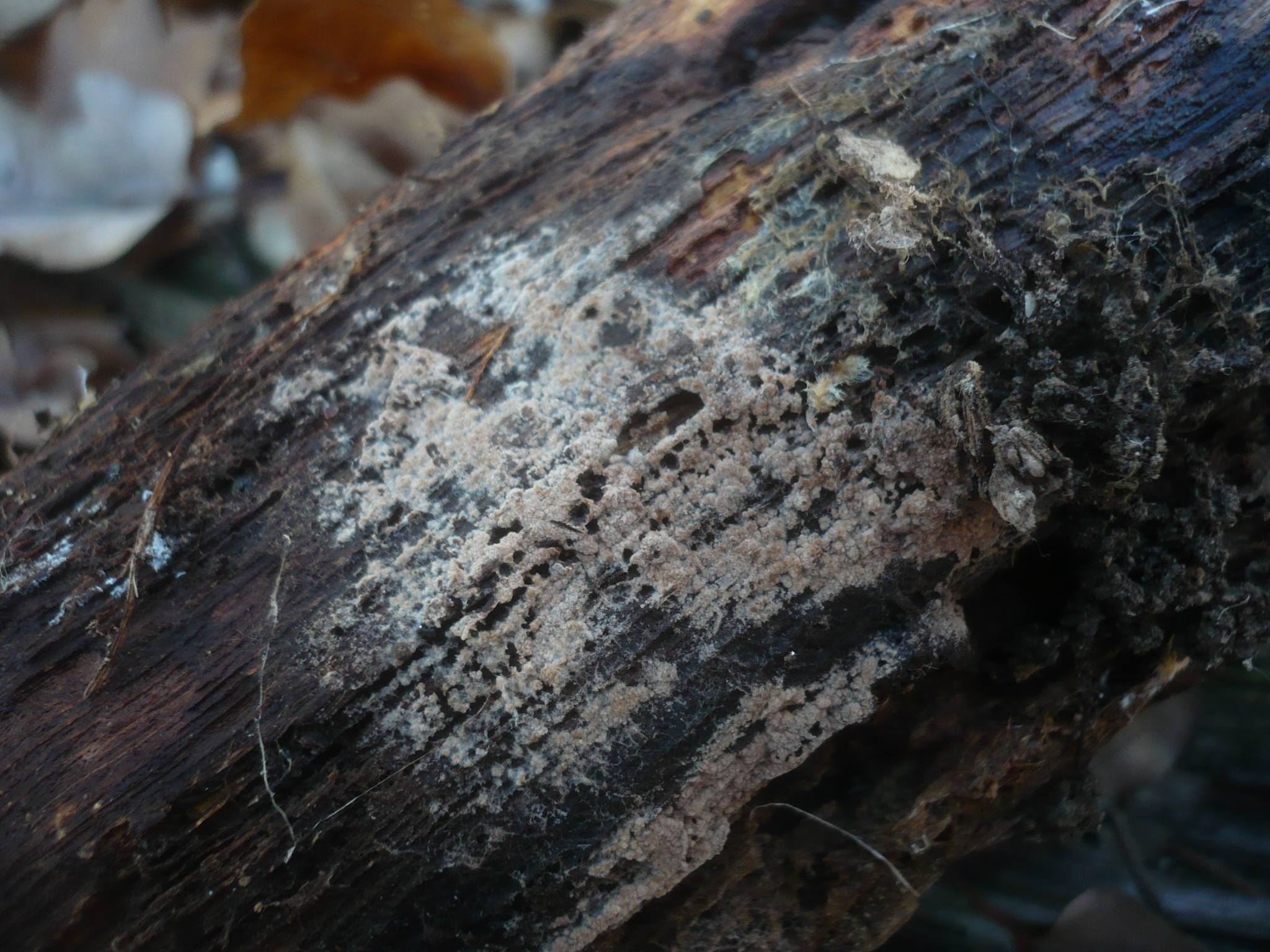
- Tomentella radiosa, Austria

Scientific classification
- Kingdom: Fungi
- Division: Basidiomycota
- Class: Agaricomycetes
- Order: Thelephorales
- Family: Thelephoraceae
- Genus: Tomentella; Pers. ex Pat. (1887)

Type species
- Tomentella ferruginea (Pers.) Pat. (1887)

Synonyms
- Odontia Pers. (1794); Odontium Rafinesque (1817); Alytosporium (Link) Ehrenb. (1818); Hypochnus Fr. (1818); Sporotrichum subgen. Alytosporium Link (1818); Caldesiella Sacc. (1877); Phaeodon subgen. Hydnopsis J.Schröt. (1888); Karstenia Britzelm. (1897); Prillieuxia Sacc. & Syd. (1899); Tomentellina Höhn. & Litsch. (1906); Hydnopsis (J.Schröt.) Rea (1909); Tomentellastrum Svrček (1958)

= Tomentella =

Genus of fungi

Tomentella is a genus of corticioid fungi in the family Thelephoraceae. The genus is ectomycorrhizal, and widespread, with about 80 species according to a 2008 estimate, although many new species have since been described. Tomentella was circumscribed by French mycologist Narcisse Théophile Patouillard in 1887.

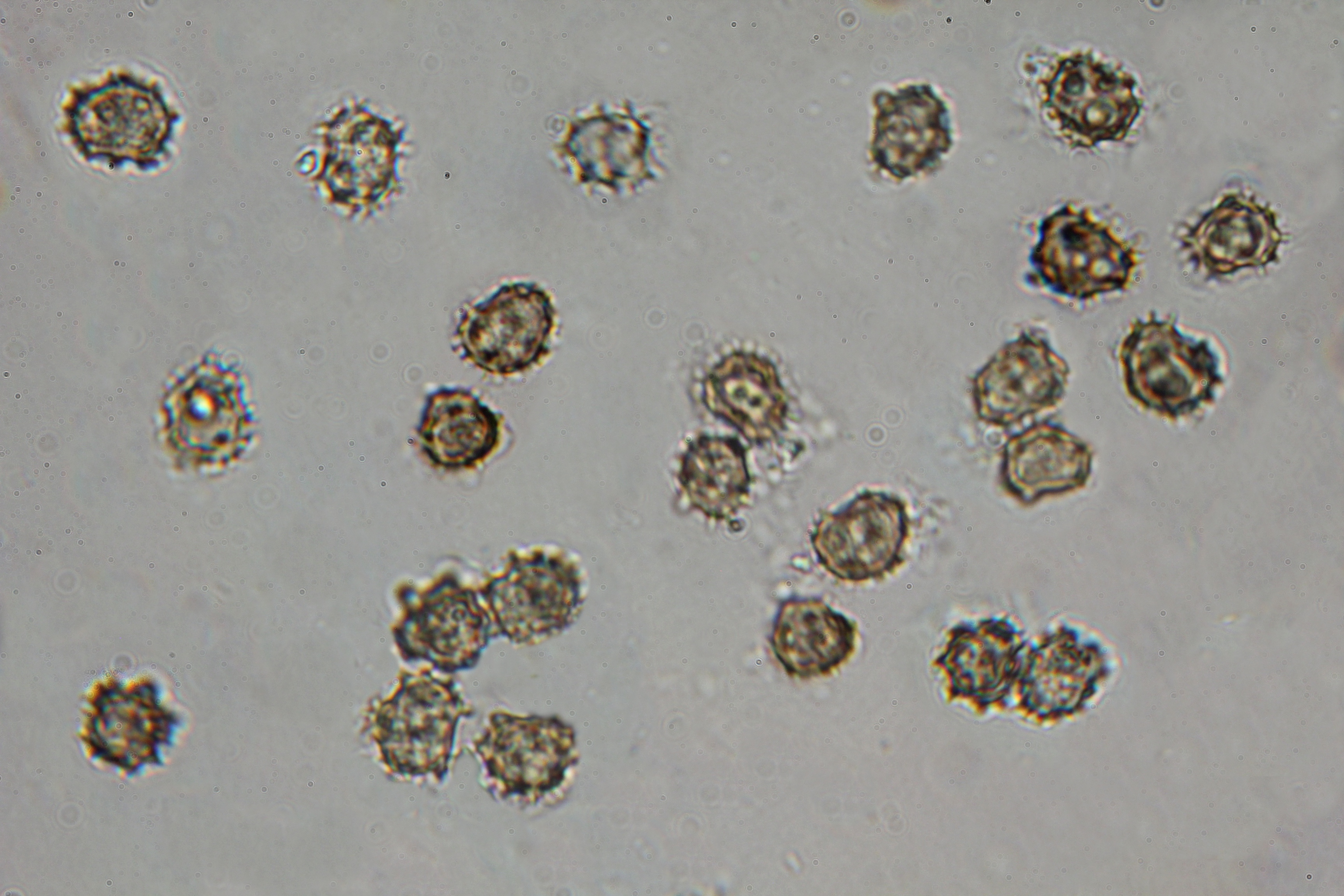
Tomentella spores 1000x

== Species ==
- T. africana – Benin (West Africa)
- T. afrostuposa
- T. agbassaensis
- T. agereri
- Tomentella alpina
- T. angulospora
- T. asperula
- T. atroarenicolor
- T. atrovirens
- T. aurantiaca
- T. badia
- T. beaverae – Seychelles
- T. brevispina
- T. brunneorufa
- T. bryophila
- T. calcicola
- T. carbonaria
- T. cinerascens
- T. cinereoumbrina
- T. clavigera
- T. coerulea
- T. crinalis
- T. donkii
- T. duemmeri
- T. ellisii
- T. epigaea
- T. ferruginea
- T. ferruginella
- T. fibrosa
- T. fragilis
- T. fraseri
- T. fungicola
- T. furcata
- T. fuscocinerea
- T. fuscoferruginosa
- T. galzinii
- T. gigaspora
- T. griseoumbrina
- T. griseoviolacea – Canada
- T. guadalupensis
- T. himalayana – Himalayas
- T. hjortstamiana – Seychelles
- T. indica – Himalayas
- T. intsiae – Seychelles
- T. italica
- T. juncicola – Benin
- T. kentuckiensis
- T. kootenaiensis
- T. lapida
- T. larssoniana – Seychelles
- T. lateritia
- T. lilacinogrisea
- T. maroana
- T. microspora
- T. molybdaea
- T. muricata
- T. nitellina
- T. oligofibula – Canary Islands
- T. olivascens
- T. parmastoana – Seychelles
- T. pellicularioides – Trinidad
- T. phylacteris
- T. pilatii
- T. pileocystidiata – Seychelles
- T. pilosa
- T. pisoniae – Seychelles
- T. puberula
- T. punicea
- T. pyrolae
- T. radiosa
- T. retiruga – Réunion
- T. scobinella
- T. spinosispora
- T. stuposa
- T. subalpina
- T. subamyloidea – Western Australia
- T. subcinerascens
- T. subclavigera
- T. subcorticioides – Himalayas
- T. sublilacina
- T. subtestacea
- T. subvinosa
- T. tedersooi – Seychelles
- T. tenuis – Seychelles
- T. terrestris
- T. testaceogilva
- T. umbrinospora
- T. variecolor
- T. vesiculosa
- T. viridescens
- T. viridula
