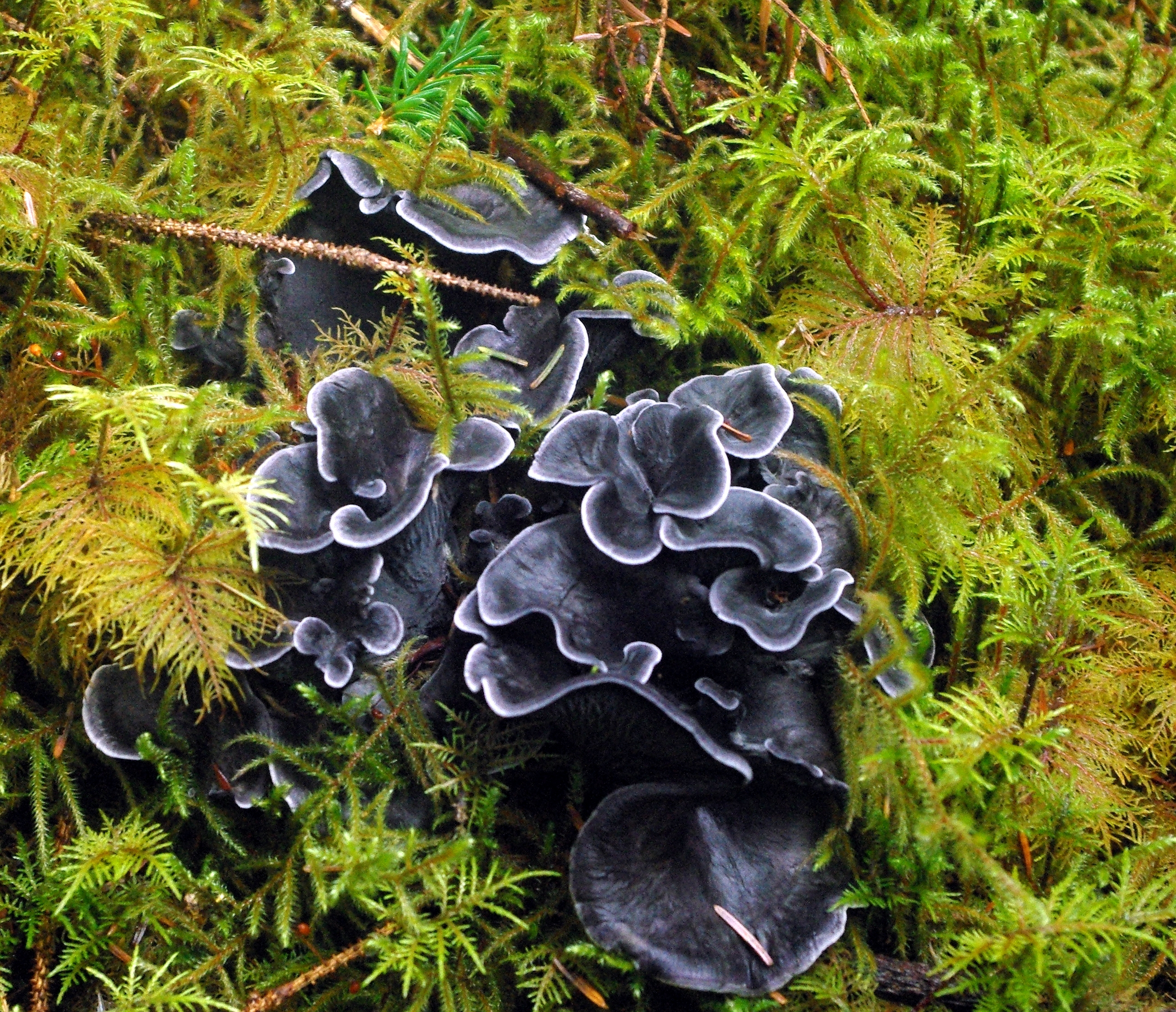
- Polyozellus multiplex

Scientific classification
- Kingdom: Fungi
- Division: Basidiomycota
- Class: Agaricomycetes
- Order: Thelephorales
- Family: Thelephoraceae; Chevall. (1826)

Type genus
- Thelephora Ehrh. ex Willd. (1787)

Genera
- See text

= Thelephoraceae =

Family of fungi

The Thelephoraceae are a family of fungi in the order Thelephorales. This grouping of mushrooms is commonly known as the "leathery earthfans".

== Genera ==
The family includes the following eight genera:

- Amaurodon
- Hypochnus
- Lenzitopsis
- Polyozellus
- Pseudotomentella
- Skepperia
- Thelephora
- Tomentella
