= Fallacinol =

Chemical compound found in some lichens

Names
- IUPAC name 1,8-Dihydroxy-3-(hydroxymethyl)-6-methoxyanthracene-9,10-dione
- Other names Teloschistin

Identifiers
CAS Number	569-05-1
3D model (JSmol)	Interactive image
ChEBI	CHEBI:144153
ChemSpider	2340806
PubChem CID	3083633
CompTox Dashboard (EPA)	DTXSID80205430
- InChI: InChI=1S/C16H12O6/c1-22-8-4-10-14(12(19)5-8)16(21)13-9(15(10)20)2-7(6-17)3-11(13)18/h2-5,17-19H,6H2,1H3 Key: WJXSYUJKJSOJOG-UHFFFAOYSA-N
- SMILES: COC1=CC2=C(C(=C1)O)C(=O)C3=C(C2=O)C=C(C=C3O)CO

Properties
Chemical formula	C_{16}H_{12}O_{6}
Molar mass	300.266 g·mol^{−1}
Appearance	orange needles
Melting point	244–246 °C (471–475 °F; 517–519 K)
- Except where otherwise noted, data are given for materials in their standard state (at 25 °C [77 °F], 100 kPa). Infobox references

Fallacinol (teloschistin) is an organic compound in the structural class of chemicals known as anthraquinones. It is found in some lichens, particularly in the family Teloschistaceae, as well as a couple of plants and non lichen-forming fungi. In 1936, Japanese chemists isolated a pigment they named fallacin from the lichen Oxneria fallax, which was later refined and assigned a tentative structural formula; by 1949, Indian chemists had isolated a substance from Teloschistes flavicans with an identical structural formula to fallacin. Later research further separated fallacin into two distinct pigments, fallacin-A (later called fallacinal) and fallacin-B (fallacinol). The latter compound is also known as teloschistin due to its structural match with the substance isolated earlier.

== History ==
In 1936, Japanese chemists Mitizo Asano and Sinobu Fuziwara reported on their chemical investigations into the colour pigments of the lichen Xanthoria fallax (now known as Oxneria fallax), found growing on the bark of mulberry trees. They isolated a pigment they named fallacin. A few years later Asano and Yosio Arata further purified the crude material from this lichen, ultimately obtaining an orange-yellow compound with a molecular formula of C_{16}H_{12}O_{6}. Using information from additional chemical tests, they proposed a tentative structural formula for fallacin. In 1949, T. R. Seshadri and S. Subramanian published their investigations into the chemistry of Teloschistes flavicans, a lichen from which they isolated an orange substance they named teloschistin, and which had a structural formula identical to that of fallacin proposed by Asano and Arata years earlier.

In 1956, Takao Murakami reported reexamining the crude pigment obtainable from Xanthoria fallax using Asano's original 1936 procedure. He separated out fallacin from parietin, a co-occurring substance, using several rounds of column chromatography, and showed that Asano's original pigment was actually a combination of two pigments with different melting points, which he designated as fallacin-A and fallacin-B. After chemically determining the structure of fallacin-A, Murakami designated this substance as fallacinal. He named the biogenically related compound fallacin-B as fallacinol. Because of Seshadri and Subramanian's work, this substance is also known as "teloschistin" in the literature.

== Extraction and isolation ==
In an early chemical examination of the lichen Teloschistes flavicans, Friedrich Wilhelm Zopf identified two substances: physcion (now known more commonly as parietin) with a melting point (m.p.) of 207 °C (405 °F) and an unidentified colourless compound with a m.p. of 240–245 °C (464–473 °F). Subsequent studies by Seshadri and Sankara Subramanian refined the extraction process, utilising a series of solvents—ether, acetone, and water—to isolate the constituents. The ether phase was found to contain all the crystalline compounds, while subsequent solvents did not yield additional extracts.

Within the ether extract, a colourless compound, referred to as substance A, was separated based on its insolubility in alkali. The alkali-soluble fraction exhibited characteristics of parietin, though impurities complicated its purification. It was eventually purified to a parietin fraction with a melting point of 206–207 °C (403–405 °F) after multiple stages of fractional crystallisation using an alcohol-chloroform mixture.

The presence of another compound with a higher melting point posed a purification challenge, which was resolved by employing petroleum ether and chloroform for sequential extraction. The petroleum ether extract contained the colourless substance A and a majority of parietin, allowing for easier purification of the latter. The chloroform extract revealed the higher-melting compound, which the authors thought was a novel substance, and which they named "teloschistin".

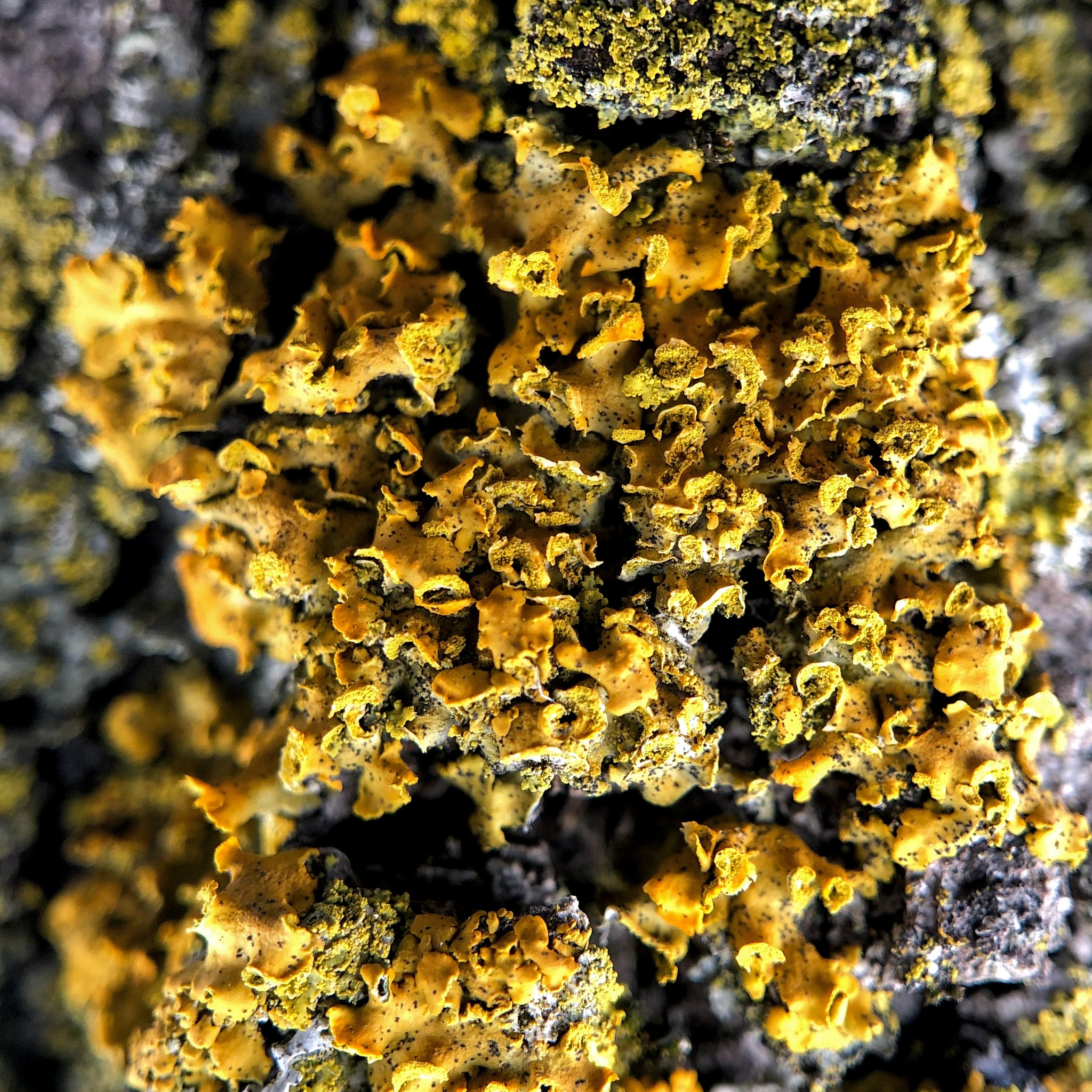
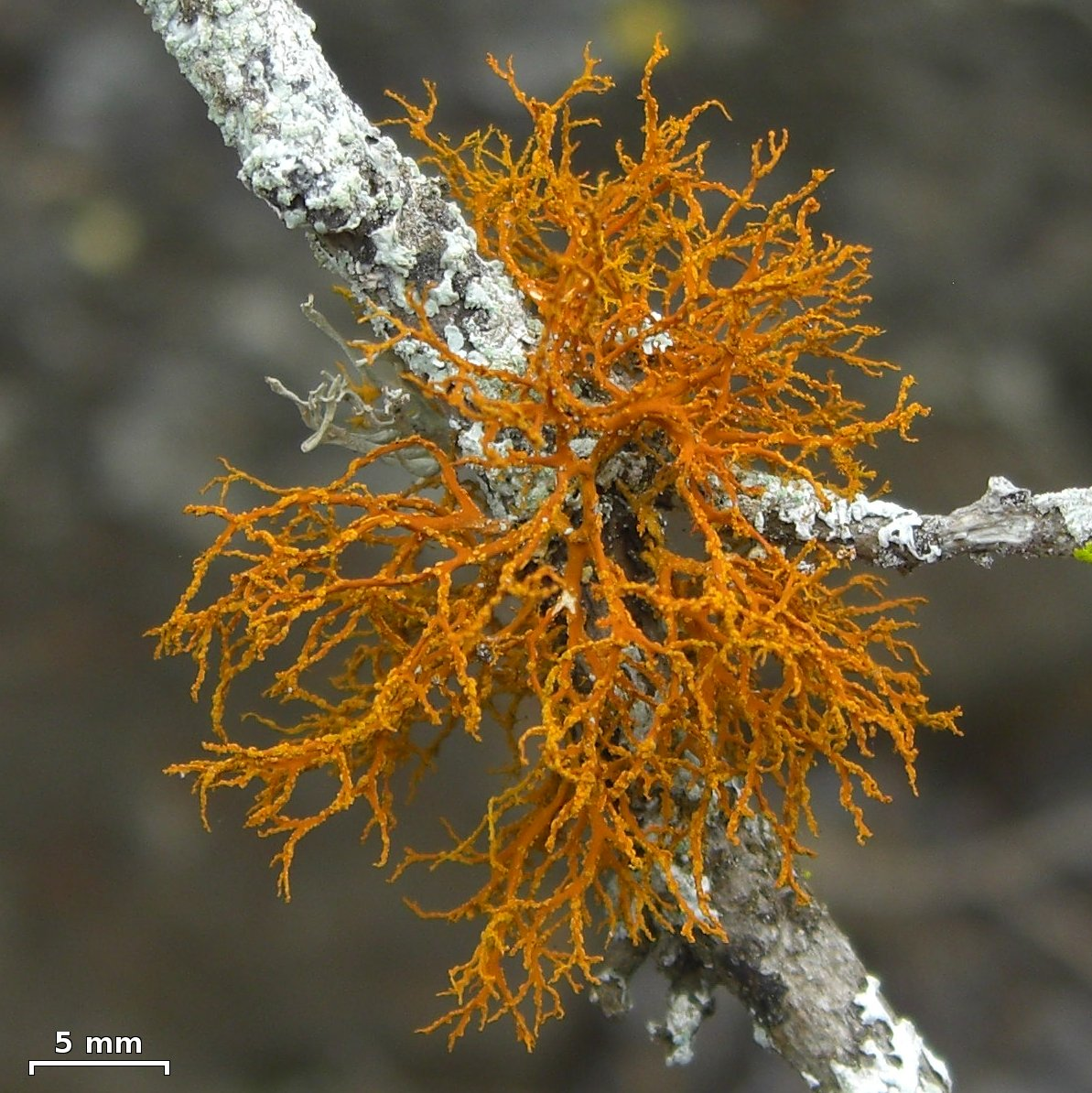
The Teloschistaceae lichens Oxneria fallax (left) and Teloschistes flavicans (right) were two early sources of fallacinol.

In 1951, Neelakantan and colleagues expanded on the initial identification of fallacinol, focusing on its chemical structure. They confirmed its molecular formula as C_{16}H_{12}O_{6} and identified it as a hydroxyl derivative of parietin, lacking specific hydroxy groupings that would typically cause fluorescence or colour changes in acidic conditions. To conclusively determine the position of its methoxyl group, fallacinol was chemically altered into a compound with a known methoxyl position, establishing it firmly in the 7-position. This process involved a series of reactions, including demethylation, reduction, and oxidation. Additionally, comparisons with similar anthraquinone derivatives through hydrolysis and other reactions further substantiated the structural findings.

The research also noted the slower-than-expected reaction rates during oxidation, suggesting a distinctive reactivity pattern for fallacinol, possibly due to its additional hydroxyl group. Finally, the study described the anthranol form of fallacinol, providing a reference for its properties and transformative behaviour.

== Properties ==
Fallacinol is a member of the class of chemical compounds called anthraquinones. Its IUPAC name is 1,8-dihydroxy-3-hydroxymethyl-6-methoxyanthraquinone. The absorbance maxima (λ_{max}) of fallacinol in the ultraviolet spectrum has five peaks of maximum absorption at 223, 251, 266, 287 nanometres; the visible spectrum has peaks at 434 and 455 nm. In the infrared spectrum, it has peaks at 1624, 1631, 1670, 3450, 3520 cm^{−1}. Fallacinol's molecular formula is C_{16}H_{12}O_{6}; it has a molecular mass of 300.26 grams per mole. In its purified crystalline form, it exists as orange needles, with a melting point of 244–246 °C (471–475 °F).

It is soluble in cold dilute potassium hydroxide, forming red-violet crystals, and is insoluble in sodium bicarbonate and carbonate solutions. Similar to parietin, it produces a reddish-brown colour with alcoholic ferric chloride and yields a deep orange-red solution with concentrated sulfuric acid, which appears eosin-like in thin layers. To early researchers, these properties suggested that fallacinol was structurally similar to parietin but with an additional oxygen atom, inferred to be a hydroxyl group, based on its higher melting point and reduced solubility. The sparing solubility of its potassium salt and its insolubility in aqueous sodium carbonate suggested a methoxyl group placement consistent with other known compounds like parietin and erythroglaucin.

Like many anthraquinones, fallacinol can be reduced to its anthranol form, where one of the quinone groups is converted to an alcohol group. This reduced form can be prepared by treating fallacinol with zinc dust in boiling acetic acid, yielding lemon-yellow prismatic crystals with a melting point of 249–250 °C. The anthranol form shows distinct colour reactions, dissolving in cold concentrated sulfuric acid to give a golden yellow colour that changes to dark green after about an hour, and slowly dissolving in sodium hydroxide to form a pink solution that eventually deposits violet-red crystals. The compound can be readily oxidised back to fallacinol using chromic acid, demonstrating the reversible nature of this reduction.

Fallacinol was shown to have antifungal activity and antibacterial activity in laboratory tests; it was particularly active against the fungus species Trichoderma harzianum, Aspergillus niger, and Penicillium verrucosum. In a study exploring lichen compounds for COVID-19 therapeutics, fallacinol demonstrated the highest binding energy against SARS-CoV-2's spike protein, suggesting its potential as an inhibitor of virus growth.

== Chemical synthesis ==
A synthetic route to fallacinol has been developed using parietin as an intermediate, highlighting a biogenetic link between the two compounds found in the lichen. The process involves the conversion of parietin diacetate to an ω-bromo derivative via N-bromosuccinimide in the presence of benzoyl peroxide, a technique also applied to various anthraquinones and related compounds. The brominated intermediate is then converted to fallacinol triacetate using silver acetate and acetic anhydride, yielding the target compound. Final steps include hydrolysis with methanolic sulfuric acid to produce fallacinol and a methylation stage for complete conversion. The synthesis not only mirrors the natural biogenesis but also achieves a melting point of 244–246 °C (471–475 °F), consistent with the purified natural product. An alternative synthesis was proposed in 1984, using a methodology employing Diels–Alder additions of naphthoquinones to mixed trimethylsilyl vinylketene acetals as a route to synthetic hydroxyanthraquinones.

== Occurrence ==
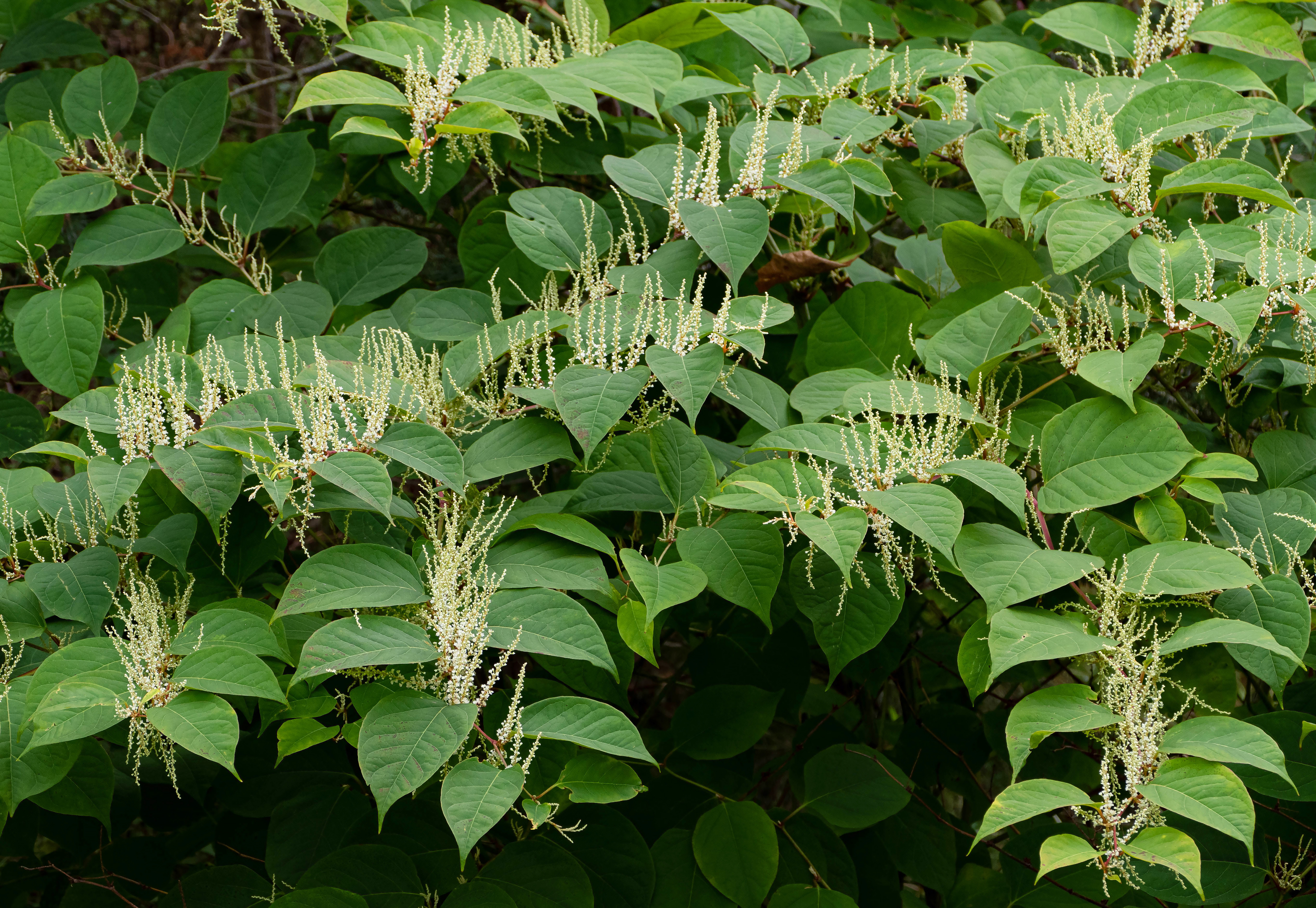
Reynoutria japonica (Japanese knotweed) is one of the few plants known to contain fallacinol.

Fallacinol occurs in many species of the Teloschistaceae, a large family of mostly lichen-forming fungi. Historically, the substance was most associated with Caloplaca, Teloschistes, and Xanthoria, but these genera have since been subdivided into many smaller, monophyletic genera. The cultivated mycobiont of Xanthoria fallax, grown in isolation from its green algal photobiont, does not produce fallacinol.

Fallacinol is a common secondary metabolite in the lichen genus Teloschistes, typically occurring in smaller amounts alongside parietin and other related compounds like fallacinal and emodin. In 1970, Johan Santesson proposed a possible biogenetic relationship between the anthraquinone compounds commonly found in Caloplaca. According to this scheme, emodin is methylated to give parietin, which then undergoes three successive oxidations, sequentially forming fallacinol, fallacinal, and then parietinic acid. A chemosyndrome is set of lichen products produced by a species, which typically includes one or more major compounds and a set of biosynthetically related minor compounds. In 2002, Ulrik Søchting and Patrik Frödén identified chemosyndrome A, the most common chemosyndrome in the genus Teloschistes and in the entire family Teloschistaceae, which features parietin as the main substance with smaller proportions of fallacinol, fallacinal, parietinic acid, and emodin.

Fallacinol has been reported from the bushy shrub plant Senna didymobotrya, widespread in eastern and central Africa, as well as from Reynoutria japonica, a plant in the knotweed family. The substance has been isolated from a culture of the marine sponge-associated fungus Talaromyces stipitatus, and from Dermocybe mushrooms, and has been detected chromatographically in extracts from several Cortinarius mushroom species.
