= Xanthaptychia aurantiaca =

Conservation status
- Endangered (IUCN 3.1)

- Critically Imperiled (NatureServe)

Scientific classification
- Kingdom: Fungi
- Division: Ascomycota
- Class: Lecanoromycetes
- Order: Teloschistales
- Family: Teloschistaceae
- Genus: Xanthaptychia
- Species: X. aurantiaca

Binomial name
- Xanthaptychia aurantiaca (R.Br.) S.Y.Kondr. & Ravera (2017)

Synonyms
- Borrera aurantiaca R.Br. (1823); Teloschistes arcticus Zahlbr. (1931); Seirophora aurantiaca (R.Br.) Frödén (2004); Xanthoanaptychia arctica (Zahlbr.) S.Y.Kondr. & Kärnefelt (2003)

Species of lichen-forming fungus

Xanthaptychia aurantiaca, the Arctic orangebush lichen, is a species of terricolous (ground-dwelling), fruticose lichen in the family Teloschistaceae. This small orange lichen is endemic to the Canadian Arctic and is known from a few scattered collections across this region. It was classified as an endangered species by the IUCN in 2020.

== Taxonomy ==
The lichen was first formally described in 1823 by the Scottish botanist Robert Brown, as Borrera aurantiaca. In his original diagnosis of the species, he noted its ascending, orange, slightly compressed, bare, and somewhat dichotomous thallus with a pale base, and very short and obtuse terminal branchlets. Brown suggested that the species was related to Borrera flavicans (now known as Teloschistes flavicans), and that both are distinguished from others by their somewhat cylindrical, shrubby thallus. He further noted that in this species, the apothecia (fruiting bodies) are unknown, and therefore the appropriate genus placement is uncertain. One of the collections made on Winter Harbour on Melville Island was later designated as a lectotype specimen.

In 1931, Alexander Zahlbruckner thought that the Teloschistes was a more appropriate generic placement for the species, but since the combination Teloschistes aurantiacus has already been used, he proposed a new name for the species, Teloschistes arcticus. Sergey Kondratyuk and Ingvar Kärnefelt moved it to the genus Xanthoanaptychia in 2003, but this genus has since been subsumed into Seirophora. In 2004, Patrick Frödén transferred the taxon to the genus Seirophora. In 2017, Kondratyuk and Sonia Ravera moved it to Xanthaptychia, giving it the binomial name by which it is now known. It is commonly known as the "Arctic orangebush lichen".

== Distribution ==
Xanthaptychia aurantiaca is native to the Inuvialuit Settlement Region in the Northwest Territories, Canada. It is found in specific areas such as Banks Island, Melville Island, Victoria Island, and the Cape Parry area on the mainland. Although it spans a considerable area in the Canadian Western Arctic, its presence is sporadic and infrequent across this range. There are only 12 known locations in the Canadian Arctic where this species has been observed, as evidenced by 18 herbarium specimens.

This lichen typically grows on the ground in coastal areas or in the hummocky tundra nearby. It thrives in harsh, sedimentary environments, often in areas shaped by ice or wind, such as hummocks or soil cracks. These crevices and sheltered spots near vegetation provide microhabitats for its growth.

In 2020, Xanthaptychia aurantiaca was classified by the International Union for Conservation of Nature as an endangered species. A later review of Red List practice for lichenized fungi cited the species as an example of an assessment based entirely on herbarium evidence: its geographical range was delimited from 18 specimens from Arctic localities that are difficult to access but considered well surveyed, and it was evaluated as endangered under criterion A3c because of inferred vulnerability to major climate-change impacts and habitat loss. It faces multiple threats related to climate change in the Canadian Arctic, including habitat loss from rapidly eroding coasts, increased sea ice melt, saline wash from storm surges, and permafrost melting. Climate change may also allow the advance of southern vegetation communities and the introduction of invasive species, further altering its native habitat.
