= Xanthaptychia =

Scientific classification
- Domain: Eukaryota
- Kingdom: Fungi
- Division: Ascomycota
- Class: Lecanoromycetes
- Order: Teloschistales
- Family: Teloschistaceae
- Genus: Xanthaptychia; S.Y.Kondr. & Ravera (2017)

Type species
- Xanthaptychia orientalis (Frödén) S.Y.Kondr. & Ravera (2017)

Species
- X. aurantiaca X. contortuplicata X. orientalis

Genus of lichens

Xanthaptychia is a genus of lichen-forming fungi in the family Teloschistaceae. The genus, circumscribed in 2017, has three corticolous (bark-dwelling) species.

== Taxonomy ==
Xanthaptychia is in the Seirophora clade of the subfamily Caloplacoideae within the family Teloschistaceae. It was circumscribed in 2017 by lichenologists Sergey Kondratyuk and Sonja Ravera. The genus forms a distinct, robust monophyletic branch, setting it apart from related genera. Four species were included in the genus. The etymology of Xanthaptychia is influenced by its resemblance to Anaptychia of the Physciaceae (in the lack of a lower cortical layer) and to xanthorioid lichens of the Teloschistaceae, evident in its foliose thallus. Xanthaptychia differs from the related Seirophora in its scleroplectenchymatous tissue in the thallus and the cortex of the thalline margin of the apothecia, and its primary distribution in high-altitude mountainous regions of northern Eurasia or North America.

== Description ==
Xanthaptychia species have a thallus that is foliose to somewhat fruticose or caespitose to pulvinate, typically forming small rosettes. The lobes are dorsiventral, oriented horizontally, and have three distinct portions: main lobes, secondary lobules, and terminal portions. The upper surface varies in colour from whitish-grey to brownish-yellow, with a whitish-grey lower side. A distinct feature is the well-developed tomentum on the upper surface.

Apothecia in Xanthaptychia are laminal and lecanorine, often large, with discs that are yellow, orange, reddish-orange, or brownish-orange. The asci are 8-spored, polarilocular with narrow septa, and hyaline. The conidia are narrowly bacilliform.

Chemically, the genus is characterized by the presence of parietin (a major component) and low concentrations of emodin, fallacinal, teloschistin, parietinic acid, and erythroglaucin.

== Habitat and distribution ==
Xanthaptychia species are predominantly corticolous, growing on a variety of tree species including Picea schrenkiana, Ephedra canisetina, Acer pubescens, A. regalis, Rhamnus sintesii, Pistacia vera, Sageretia laetevirens, Amygdalus buharica, and species of the genera Populus and Juniperus. They are typically found in montane belts at altitudes ranging from 1,100 to 2,100 m (3,600 to 6,900 ft). Ecologically, the genus is distributed across the Northern Hemisphere, favouring high altitudes in mountainous regions or polar latitudes of Eurasia and North America.

== Species ==
- Xanthaptychia aurantiaca (R.Br.) S.Y.Kondr. & Ravera (2017)
- Xanthaptychia contortuplicata (Ach.) S.Y.Kondr. & Ravera (2017)
- Xanthaptychia orientalis (Frödén) S.Y.Kondr. & Ravera (2017)

The proposed new combination Xanthaptychia blumii (S.Y.Kondr. & Moniri) S.Y.Kondr. & Ravera (2017), found in Turkmenistan, was not validly published by the authors.
