= Fallacinal =

Chemical compound found in some lichens

Names
- IUPAC name 4,5-Dihydroxy-7-methoxy-9,10-dioxoanthracene-2-carbaldehyde
- Other names: 2-Anthracenecarboxaldehyde, 9,10-dihydro-4,5-dihydroxy-7-methoxy-9,10-dioxo- 1,8-Dihydroxy-6-methoxy-9,10-dioxo-9,10-dihydroanthracene-3-carbaldehyde

Identifiers
CAS Number	4517-57-1
3D model (JSmol)	Interactive image
ChEBI	CHEBI:144151
ChemSpider	57525052
PubChem CID	15559229
CompTox Dashboard (EPA)	DTXSID10196408
- InChI: InChI=1S/C16H10O6/c1-22-8-4-10-14(12(19)5-8)16(21)13-9(15(10)20)2-7(6-17)3-11(13)18/h2-6,18-19H,1H3 Key: MCPKJGRRWINKOH-UHFFFAOYSA-N
- SMILES: COC1=CC2=C(C(=C1)O)C(=O)C3=C(C2=O)C=C(C=C3O)C=O

Properties
Chemical formula	C_{16}H_{10}O_{6}
Molar mass	298.250 g·mol^{−1}
Appearance	orange-red needles
Melting point	250–252 °C (482–486 °F; 523–525 K)
- Except where otherwise noted, data are given for materials in their standard state (at 25 °C [77 °F], 100 kPa). Infobox references

Fallacinal is an organic compound in the structural class of chemicals known as anthraquinones. It is found in many species of the lichen family Teloschistaceae.

== History ==
In 1936, Japanese chemists Mitizo Asano and Sinobu Fuziwara reported on their investigations into the colour pigments of the lichen Xanthoria fallax (now known as Oxneria fallax), found growing on the bark of mulberry trees. They isolated a pigment they named fallacin. A few years later Asano and Yosio Arata further purified the crude material from this lichen, ultimately obtaining an orange-yellow compound with a molecular formula of C_{16}H_{12}O_{6}. Using information from additional chemical tests, they proposed a tentative structural formula for fallacin. In 1949, T. R. Seshadri and S. Subramanian described their work with the Indian lichen Teloschistes flavicans, in which they isolated an orange substance they named teloschistin, and which had a structural formula identical to that of fallacin proposed by Asano and Arata years earlier.

In 1956, Takao Murakami reported reexamining the crude pigment obtainable from Xanthoria fallax using Asano's original 1936 procedure. He separated out fallacin from parietin, a co-occurring substance, using several rounds of column chromatography, and showed that Asano's original pigment was actually a combination of two pigments with different melting points, which he designated as fallacin-A and fallacin-B. Murakami determined fallacin-A to have a melting point of 251–252 °C (484–486 °F) and a molecular formula of C_{16}H_{10}O_{6}. He established the structure of the compound synthetically by oxidizing it with chromium trioxide, converting that into its acid chloride, and then performing catalytic reduction on this compound using the Rosenmund reduction followed by deacetylation. The resultant product was confirmed to be identical to fallacin-A, and so he designated this substance as fallacinal. He named fallacin-B as fallacinol, a closely related substance that, because of Seshadri and Subramanian's work, is also known as "teloschistin" in the literature.

== Occurrence ==
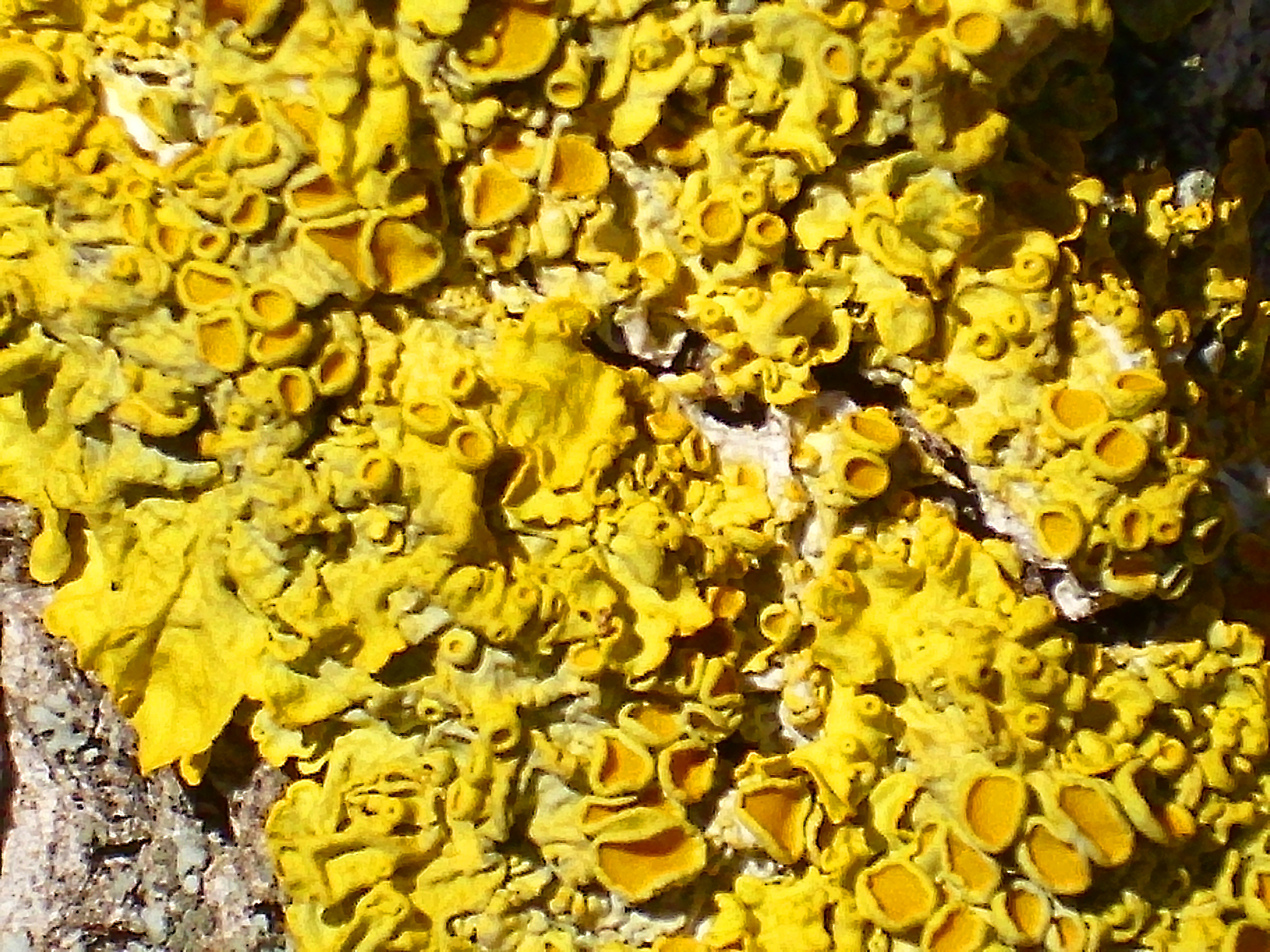
Fallacinal was first chemically isolated from Oxneria fallax.

Fallacinal occurs in many species of Teloschistaceae, a large family of mostly lichen-forming fungi. Historically, the substance was most associated with Caloplaca, Teloschistes, and Xanthoria, but these genera have since been subdivided into many smaller, monophyletic genera. The cultivated mycobiont of Xanthoria fallax, grown in isolation with the green algal photobiont, still produces fallacinal.

Yoshio Hirose and colleagues proposed a synthesis of fallacinal in 1982 involving the oxidation of fallacinol (teloschistin).

In 1970, the Swedish chemist Johan Santesson proposed a possible biogenetic relationship between the anthraquinone compounds commonly found in the lichen genus Caloplaca. According to this scheme, emodin is methylated to give parietin, which then undergoes three successive oxidations, sequentially forming fallacinol, fallacinal, and then parietinic acid. A chemosyndrome is a set of biosynthetically related compounds produced by a lichen. In 2002, Ulrik Søchting and Patrik Frödén identified chemosyndrome A, the most common chemosyndrome in the genus Teloschistes and in the entire family Teloschistaceae, which features parietin as the main substance and smaller proportions of fallacinol, fallacinal, parietinic acid, and emodin.

== Properties ==
In its purified form, fallacinal exists as orange-red needles with a melting point of 250–252 °C (482–486 °F). Its ultraviolet spectrum has five peaks of maximum absorption (λ_{max}) at 244, 264, 280, 340, and 425 nm. Its infrared spectrum has three peaks at 1625, 1675, and 1720 cm^{−1}; the first two of these peaks corresponds to the chelated and non-chelated ketones, respectively, while the third peak indicates the aromatic aldehyde grouping.
