= Amolak Chand Jain =

Indian chemist (1928–2021)

- Born: 27 December 1928; Delhi, British India
- Died: 23 May 2021 (aged 92)
- Education: Delhi University; Cambridge University
- Known for: Studies on polyphenols, flavonoids and isoflavonoids
- Awards: 1969 Shanti Swarup Bhatnagar Prize
- Scientific career
- Fields: Bioorganic chemistry; Organic chemistry
- Workplaces: Delhi University; University of Jammu; Himachal Pradesh University; Texas A&M University; Budapest University; University of Mauritius
- Doctoral advisor: T. R. Seshadri; George Wallace Kenner

Amolak Chand Jain (27 December 1928 – 23 May 2021) was an Indian natural product chemist, academic and the head of the department of chemistry at Delhi University, University of Jammu and Himachal Pradesh University. He is known for his studies on polyphenols, flavonoids and isoflavonoids and their syntheses. He is an elected fellow of the Indian National Science Academy and the National Academy of Sciences, India and a life member of the International Academy of Physical Sciences. The Council of Scientific and Industrial Research, the apex agency of the Government of India for scientific research, awarded him the Shanti Swarup Bhatnagar Prize for Science and Technology, one of the highest Indian science awards, in 1969, for his contributions to chemical sciences.

== Biography ==
Amolak Chand Jain, born on 27 December 1928 to Jugal Kishore Jain and Kala Wati in the Indian capital of Delhi, graduated in chemistry (BSc hons) in 1948 from the University of Delhi and passed his master's degree from the same university in 1950. After a brief stint as a research assistant at his alma mater, he started his career as a lecturer in 1952 at the department of chemistry and did his doctoral studies under the guidance of T. R. Seshadri, a renowned chemist and Padma Bhushan recipient, to secure his PhD in 1954. Moving to Cambridge University in 1956, he did researches on chlorophyll synthesis at the laboratory of George Wallace Kenner, a Fellow of the Royal Society, and secured another PhD in 1958. He returned to India the same year to resume his career at Delhi University and continued his researches on a senior research fellowship from the Indian National Science Academy. While serving as a reader from 1961, he received a UNESCO fellowship in 1966 which assisted him to continue his researches in Moscow which earned him the degree of Doctor of Science in 1967. Two years later, he was appointed as a professor and head of the department of chemistry at the University of Jammu where he stayed till 1973 when he moved to Himachal Pradesh University as the head of the chemistry department there. In 1978, he returned to Delhi University where he spent the rest of his career. In between, he had short stints at Texas Agricultural and Mechanical University (1986), Budapest University and University of Mauritius (1989–90) as a visiting professor.

Working on polyphenols early in his research career, Jain elucidated the structure of several compounds in natural products. It was during this period, he worked on the biogenesis of chlorophylls and developed new protocols for the synthesis of polyphenols. Later, he focused on the chemistry of flavonoids and isoflavonoids and is reported to have achieved the synthesis of a number of such products. He has published his research findings by way of over 275 articles published in peer-reviewed journals (Note: Please see Selected bibliography section) and has authored a text book on organic chemistry. He guided 30 MPhil and 30 PhD students in their studies. He is also associated with Indian Science Abstracts journal as a member of its editorial board.

A senior scientist of the Indian National Science Academy from 1995 to 2000, Jain contributed to the restructuring of academic courses during his tenure at Delhi University from 1985 to 1991. He is a life member of the International Academy of Physical Sciences, Indian Chemical Society, Indian Science Congress Association and the Chemical Research Society of India. He was a UGC National Professor in 1976 and is an elected fellow of the Indian National Science Academy and the National Academy of Sciences, India. The Council of Scientific and Industrial Research awarded Jain the Shanti Swarup Bhatnagar Prize, one of the highest Indian science awards, in 1969. The University of Delhi have instituted an annual scholarship, Professor A. C. Jain Fellowship, to recognize academic excellence in organic chemistry among post-graduate students.

Jain died on 23 May 2021, at the age of 92.

== Selected bibliography ==
- Amolak Chand Jain, Bhola Nath Sharma (November 1972). "Synthesis of (±)-7,3′- and 7,4′-di-O-methyleriodictyol and of velutin and pilloin". Phytochemistry. 12 (6): 1455–1458. doi:10.1016/0031-9422(73)80583-7.
- Amolak Chand Jain, Surendra Mohan Anand (1974). "Claisen rearrangement of 1-hydroxy-3-(3-methylbut-2-enyloxy)xanthones". J. Chem. Soc., Perkin Trans. 1. 1: 329–333. doi:10.1039/P19740000329.
- Amolak Chand Jain, Bhola Nath Sharma (1974). "Synthesis of alpinum isoflavone, osajin, and warangalone". J. Org. Chem. 39 (15): 2215–2217. doi:10.1021/jo00929a016.

== See also ==
- T. R. Seshadri
- George Wallace Kenner
