= Lazarenkoiopsis =

Scientific classification
- Domain: Eukaryota
- Kingdom: Fungi
- Division: Ascomycota
- Class: Lecanoromycetes
- Order: Teloschistales
- Family: Teloschistaceae
- Genus: Lazarenkoiopsis; S.Y.Kondr., Lőkös & Hur (2017)
- Species: L. ussuriensis

Binomial name
- Lazarenkoiopsis ussuriensis (Oxner, S.Y.Kondr. & Elix) S.Y.Kondr., Lőkös & Hur (2017)

Synonyms
- Caloplaca ussuriensis Oxner, S.Y.Kondr. & Elix (2011); Gyalolechia ussuriensis (Oxner, S.Y.Kondr. & Elix) Vondrák (2016)

Species of lichen

Lazarenkoiopsis is a single-species fungal genus in the family Teloschistaceae. It contains Lazarenkoiopsis ussuriensis, a corticolous (bark-dwelling), crustose lichen species found in the Russian Far East.

== Taxonomy ==
The lichen was first described scientifically in 2011 by the lichenologists Alfred Oxner, Sergey Kondratyuk, and John Elix, as Caloplaca ussuriensis. The species name is derived from the Primorsky region's historical name, the Ussuriysk region. The taxon was transferred to the newly created genus Lazarenkoiopsis in 2020; it is its type and only species. The genus name honours Andrij Sozontovych Lazarenko (1901–1979), a Ukrainian bryologist. Lazarenkoiopsis is in the subfamily Caloplacoideae of the family Teloschistaceae.

== Description ==
The thallus of Lazarenkoiopsis ussuriensis is 2–3 cm wide, thick and smooth, and can be distinctly cracked with broad cracks up to 0.07 mm wide. The areoles range from 0.5 to 2.5 mm in width. The upper surface is whitish, dull greyish-white to grey, or greenish grey-brown, with bright to dull yellow soralia. The soralia are initially rounded or irregular in shape, eventually becoming confluent and forming elongated fissure-like structures.

In cross-section, the thallus is 70–200 μm thick, with a cortical layer of 20–50 μm. Apothecia are 0.5–1 mm in diameter and up to 0.3 mm high, initially zeorine in form with well-developed margins, later becoming lecanorine. The thalline exciple is 60–70 μm thick, and the true exciple is 30–40 μm wide in the upper portion, thinning towards the base. The hymenium reaches up to 70 μm high, with paraphyses lacking swollen tips. Ascospores are broadly ellipsoid to almost spherical or elongated, with a wide septum.

Lazarenkoiopsis ussuriensis contains several secondary metabolites (lichen products), including fragilin and parietin as major constituents, along with minor amounts of emodin, 7-chloroemodin, erythroglaucin, 7-chloroparietinic acid, physcoin bysanthrone, and traces of physcoin 9-anthrone and physcoin 10-anthrone.

Genus Lazarenkoiopsis closely resembles the genus Solitaria from the subfamily Xanthorioideae. It is distinct due to its notably cracked-areolated, thicker thallus, and the presence of numerous oil droplets within its hymenium. Its true exciple has a textura intricata tissue structure (with intricately tangled hyphae). Unlike Solitaria, the paraphyses in Lazarenkoiopsis do not swell at the tips.

== Similar species ==
Lazarenkoiopsis ussuriensis is similar to Solitaria chrysophthalma but can be distinguished by its thicker, cracked-areolated thallus, and the presence of numerous oil droplets in the subhymenium. It differs from Oxneriopsis oxneri by having soralia instead of phyllidia and schizidia. Compared to Caloplaca brunneola and Obscuroplaca camptidia, it has lecanorine rather than biatorine apothecia and larger ascospores. L. ussuriensis also differs from Caloplaca spadicea by not having three-septate ascospores and a minutely isidiate thallus.

== Habitat, distribution, and ecology ==
Lazarenkoiopsis ussuriensis has been observed in several locations within the Far East of Russia, particularly in the Primorsky Krai region. Regularly found growing alongside Oxneriopsis oxneri, L. ussuriensis is often mistaken for having both isidia and soredia. It differs from O. oxneri in its non-exfoliating upper surface and non-visible medulla. Caloplaca cerina is also sometimes associated but differs in apothecial colour and the absence of soralia.
