= Seirophora lacunosa =

Scientific classification
- Domain: Eukaryota
- Kingdom: Fungi
- Division: Ascomycota
- Class: Lecanoromycetes
- Order: Teloschistales
- Family: Teloschistaceae
- Genus: Seirophora
- Species: S. lacunosa

Binomial name
- Seirophora lacunosa (Rupr.) Frödén (2004)

Synonyms
- Ramalina lacunosa Rupr. (1845); Teloschistes lacunosus (Rupr.) Savicz (1935); Xanthoanaptychia villosa subsp. lacunosa (Rupr.) S.Y.Kondr. & Kärnefelt (2003)

Species of lichen

Seirophora lacunosa is a species of saxicolous (rock-dwelling), fruticose lichen in the family Teloschistaceae. It is endemic to the semi-arid regions of southeastern Spain.

== Taxonomy ==
The species was first formally described as new to science by Franz Josef Ruprecht in 1845, as Ramalina lacunosa. Vsevolod Savich proposed that it should be transferred to the genus Teloschistes in 1935. Sergey Kondratyuk and Ingvar Kärnefelt thought the taxon should be a subspecies of Xanthoanaptychia villosa. In 2004, Patrik Frödén transferred it to the genus Seirophora.

== Habitat, distribution, and ecology ==
In the arid Tabernas Desert of Almeria, Spain, researchers investigated the hydration sources—rain, dew, and water vapour—that enable Teloschistes lacunosus to survive, probing into the reasons behind its distribution patterns. The field study, which took place over different seasons on a pediment (a gently sloping inclined bedrock surface) and an east-facing slope, employed chlorophyll a fluorescence to monitor photosynthetic activity and recorded microclimatic data to understand habitat influences on lichen wetness and activity. Findings showed that T. lacunosus requires liquid water to activate photosynthesis, with atmospheric humidity alone being insufficient. The pediment, with its more favourable microclimate, had a higher frequency of dew, leading to longer periods of lichen activity compared to the harsher conditions on the east-facing slope.

Teloschistes lacunosus thrives inland where the conditions are drier compared to coastal areas. This species is adapted to higher temperatures, showing a greater tolerance to heat and an ability to photosynthesize efficiently under intense light. Unlike its coastal counterparts, it maintains lower respiration rates in moist and warm conditions, indicating a more conservative use of water. These characteristics contribute to its distinct distribution, favouring the warm and light-abundant habitats of the Spanish badlands.
