= Hilda Tracy =

British physiologist (1927–2010)

Hilda J. Tracy
- Born: 14 October 1927; Birkenhead, UK
- Died: 9 February 2010 (aged 82)
- Citizenship: British
- Education: University of Liverpool, UK
- Known for: study of gastrin
- Fields: human physiology, medicine
- Workplaces: University of Liverpool, UK

Hilda Tracy (14 October 1927 – 9 February 2010) was a British physiologist. She worked at University of Liverpool, UK, with Rod Gregory FRS to isolate and characterise the gastrointestinal hormone gastrin. She led the structure-function studies and had the first insight into gastrin's role in the clinical pathology of pancreatic Zollinger-Ellison tumours.

== Education and personal life ==
Hilda Tracy was born on 14 October 1927 and was one of 4 children. Following her school education in Birkenhead, UK, she began working at Unilever on Merseyside. She was soon seconded to the University of Liverpool and joined the newly appointed Rod Gregory, Holt Professor of Physiology, and Head of Department, as a research assistant in 1950. With his encouragement she enrolled on a degree in medicine, gaining several prizes during her studies. She was a lecturer in the Department of Physiology from 1958 until she retired in 1993. She married in the 1950s and had two children.

== Career ==
Tracy worked primarily with Gregory until his death in 1990. Their collaboration defined understanding of the acid-secretory hormone gastrin during the 1960s and 70s. The hypothesis that a peptide was involved in control of secretion of gastric acid in the stomach had been accepted in the 1930s but the identity of the peptide was unknown. Between 1962 and 1968 their work isolated gastrin for the first time and sequenced it (in collaboration with George Kenner from the Department of Chemistry at University of Liverpool). They developed methods to isolate the 17 aminoacid gastrin peptide, starting from hundreds of pig stomachs for each preparation and initially identified two forms, distinguished by sulphation of a tyrosine residue. They went on to show that the 4 C-terminal aminoacid residues were responsible for all the hormone's activity.

She led in the structure-function studies, leading to development of a short peptide as a pharmaceutical.

Through her medical training, Tracy linked gastrin to a disease in humans, the rare cancer Zollinger–Ellison syndrome where excessive production of gastrin results in peptic ulcers. She drove this aspect of their research forwards that involved collaborations in the USA.

== Legacy ==
In 2017 the annual Hilda Tracy Lecture was inaugurated in the Institute of Translational Medicine, University of Liverpool, the successor organisation to where she worked. The first lecture was given by Dame Nicola Anne "Nicky" Cullum. The second in 2018 was by Professor Dame Margaret Whitehead about 'How does low income cause ill-health ? A public health perspective.' The 2019 lecture was given by Professor Maria Fitzgerald about 'Pain: a lifelong journey'.

== Selected publications ==
Tracy was author or co-author of over 32 scientific publications. They included:

- Gregory, R.A.; Tracy, H.J.; French, J.M.; Sircus, W. (1960). "Extraction of a gastrin-like substance from a pancreatic tumour in a case of Zollinger-Ellison syndrome" (PDF). Lancet. 1: 1045–1048.
- Grossman, M.I., Tracy, H.J., and Gregory R.A. Zollinger-Ellison syndrome in a Bantu woman, with isolation of a gastrin-like substance from primary and secondary tumors. 2. Extraction of gastrin-like activity from tumors. Gastroenterology 41 87- (1961)
- R.A. Gregory and Hilda J. Tracy. Preparation and properties of gastrin. J Physiology (London) 156 523 - 543 (1961)
- Stanley R. Friesen, Tracy, Hilda J., and Gregory, R. A. Mechanism of the gastric hypersection in the Zollinger-Ellison Syndrome: successful extraction of gastrin-like activity from metastases and primary pancreatico-duodenal islet cell carcinoma. Annals of Surgery, 155(2): 167–174. (1962)
- Hilda J. Tracy and Gregory, R. A. The antral Hormone Gastrin: Physiological Properties of a Series of Synthetic Peptides structurally related to Gastrin I. Nature, 204, 935 - 938 (1964)
- R.A. Gregory and Hilda J. Tracy. The constitution and properties of two gastrins extracted from hog antral mucosa. Part I The isolation of two gastrins from hog antral mucosa. Gut 5, 103 - 107 (1964)
- R.A. Gregory and Hilda J. Tracy. The constitution and properties of two gastrins extracted from hog antral mucosa. Part II The properties of two gastrins isolated from hog antral mucosa. Gut 5, 107 - 117 (1964)
- R.A. Gregory and Hilda J, Tracy, Note on nature of gastrin-like stimulant present in Zollinger-Ellison tumours. Gut 5 115 - (1964)
- J.S. Morley, Tracy, Hilda J., and Gregory, R. A. Structure–Function Relationships in the Active C-Terminal Tetrapeptide Sequence of Gastrin. Nature, 207, 1356 - 1359 (1965).
- R.A. Gregory, Tracy, Hilda J., and Grossman, Morton I. Human Gastrin: Isolation, Structure and Synthesis. Nature, 209, 583 (5 February 1966)
- R.A. Gregory and Hilda J. Tracy. Isolation of 2 big-gastrins from Zollinger-Ellison tumor tissue. Lancet 2 (7781) 797 - 799 (1972)
- G.J. Dockray and Hilda J. Tracy. Atropine does not abolish cephalic vagal stimulation of gastrin release in dogs. J. Physiol., 306, 473–480 (1980)
- G.J. Dockray, Gregory, R.A., Tracy, H.J. and Wen-Yu Zhu. Transport of cholecystokinin-octapeptide-like immunoreactivity toward the gut in afferent vagal fibers in cat and dog. J Physiology (London) 314 501 - 511 (1981)
