= Teloschistes spinosus =

Scientific classification
- Domain: Eukaryota
- Kingdom: Fungi
- Division: Ascomycota
- Class: Lecanoromycetes
- Order: Teloschistales
- Family: Teloschistaceae
- Genus: Teloschistes
- Species: T. spinosus

Binomial name
- Teloschistes spinosus (Hook.f. & Taylor) Js.Murray (1960)

Synonyms
- Parmelia spinosa Hook.f. & Taylor (1844); Xanthoria spinosa (Hook.f. & Taylor) Du Rietz (1922); Teloschistes spinosus f. subteres Filson (1969)

Species of lichen

Teloschistes spinosus is a species of corticolous (bark-dwelling), fruticose lichen in the family Teloschistaceae. It is found in Australia and New Zealand.

== Taxonomy ==
The lichen was first formally described by the botanists Joseph Dalton Hooker and Thomas Taylor in 1844, from specimens collected in Van Diemen's Land (now Tasmania), Australia. They initially classified it in the genus Parmelia. Gustaf Einar Du Rietz suggested its inclusion in the genus Xanthoria in 1922. James Murray transferred it to Teloschistes in 1960. He recorded its presence on New Zealand's South Island, but suggested it might be "very local", as it had not been recorded in several other similar locales.

Rex Filson proposed the varietysubteres in 1969. This variety, identified in Victoria, Tasmania, and New South Wales, differs from the typical form of the species in having larger, clearly almost cylindrical lobes.

== Description ==
Teloschistes spinosus has a thallus that ranges in colour from yellow to orange-yellow. Initially, it appears as small scales on twigs but eventually forms small, cushion-like clusters up to 3 cm in diameter and 2–5 mm high. The thallus has numerous slender, star-shaped lobes that are typically 1–3 mm long, occasionally reaching up to 5 mm. These lobes are narrow, about 0.3–0.8 mm wide, and relatively thin, with a thickness of 0.1–0.15 mm. They are sparsely branched and range from flat to slightly curved upward (caniculate) on top, while being loosely attached (adnate) to the substrate or sometimes standing upright. These lobes are adorned with scattered, hair-like extensions (fibrils) that are similar in colour to the thallus and measure 1–1.5 mm long, and there are also a few whitish root-like structures (rhizines) on the lower surface. This species does not produce soredia, which are granular clusters of cells used for vegetative reproduction.

The upper cortex of the thallus is fibrous, about 20–50 μm thick, composed of tightly packed 4 μm-thick fungal filaments (hyphae). Below this layer, the algal layer is irregularly distributed, containing cells of the green algal genus Trebouxia about 10–18 μm in diameter. The medulla, or innermost layer of the thallus, features loosely intertwined thin-walled hyphae about 3 μm in diameter. The lower cortex is up to 50 μm thick and is a mix of fibrous and more tightly packed (paraplectenchymatous) tissue.

The reproductive structures, or apothecia, initially form directly on the upper surface of the thallus and later raise on 2–4 mm long grooved stalks as the thallus thickens and becomes erect. These are 3–5 mm in diameter, flat or slightly convex, with a subtly wavy edge that gradually becomes indistinct. The disc of the apothecia is slightly darker than the thallus and has a matte finish. Below the disc, the hypothecium (the layer beneath the spore-producing hymenium) is obscurely cellular and measures 40–45 μm high. The hymenium itself is 65 μm high and mostly clear, except for an orange granular top layer (epithecium).

The spore-producing cells (asci) are 40 by 13 μm, with a thickened upper part. Spores are broadly ellipsoid, measuring 13–15 by 6–7.5 μm. Additionally, pycnidia—small fruiting bodies producing asexual spores—are semi-immersed near the margins of the lobes. They are spherical, 150 μm in diameter, orange, and produce cylindrical pycnidiospores that are 3 by 1 μm.

== Species interactions ==
Arthonia anjutae is a lichenicolous fungus that has been recorded parasitising Teloschistes spinosus specimens collected in South Australia.
