= Teloschistes peruensis =

Conservation status
- Critically Endangered (IUCN 3.1)

Scientific classification
- Domain: Eukaryota
- Kingdom: Fungi
- Division: Ascomycota
- Class: Lecanoromycetes
- Order: Teloschistales
- Family: Teloschistaceae
- Genus: Teloschistes
- Species: T. peruensis

Binomial name
- Teloschistes peruensis (Ach.) J.W.Thomson (1968)

Synonyms
- Borrera pubera var. peruensis Ach. (1814); Physcia flavicans *** Physcia peruensis (Ach.) Nyl. (1858); Teloschistes flavicans var. peruensis (Ach.) Müll.Arg. (1883)

Species of lichen

Teloschistes peruensis is a species of terricolous (ground-dwelling) fruticose lichen in the family Teloschistaceae. It is found only in a few small areas in Peru and Chile. It has been assessed as Critically Endangered by the International Union for Conservation of Nature due to its small population, limited geographic range, and various threats.

== Taxonomy ==
The lichen was first scientifically described in 1814 by the Swedish lichenologist Erik Acharius, who named it Borrera pubera var. peruensis. In 1858, William Nylander considered it a subspecies of what is today known as Teloschistes flavicans, while in 1883, Johannes Müller Argoviensis treated it as a variety of T. flavicans. John Walter Thomson thought it was sufficiently unique from these other species to elevate it to distinct species status in 1968.

== Description ==
Teloschistes peruensis is distinguished by its ability to form extensive, rounded colonies, reaching dimensions of 30–40 cm (12–16 in) in diameter and approximately 8 cm (3 1/8 in) in height. In its natural habitat, the lobes of this species show a vivid deep orange hue, though they tend to become brown once preserved in a herbarium. The lobes are intricately interwoven, with a dichotomous branching pattern, and measure between 0.2 and 0.5 mm in width and 2–4 cm (13/16–1 9/16 in) in height. This species is adorned with long, tapering cilia that form irregularly along the edges and at the tips of the lobes, which are either cylindrical or partly flattened and occasionally display channel-like depressions with fissures that open unpredictably along the thallus.

The surface of Teloschistes peruensis is smooth and matte, with varying concentrations of short, transparent fibrils that become apparent under 20x magnification. This species does not produce soredia and is devoid of isidia, which are vegetative structures (propagules) that aid in reproduction and dispersion. Additionally, both apothecia and pycnidia, which are structures associated with sexual and asexual reproduction, respectively, have not been observed in this species.

Parietin is the only lichen substance that has been associated with this species.

== Habitat and distribution ==
Teloschistes peruensis is adapted to the open, arid, and sandy environments of the coastal fog deserts in south-central Peru and north-central Chile, thriving primarily in areas with significant fog influence, especially from May to November. In Peru, it forms part of a unique ecosystem alongside ephemeral desert annuals and perennial cacti, existing in isolated lichen meadows at 550 m (1,800 ft) elevation, it also establishes itself loosely on sandy soils or as an epiphyte overgrowing shrubs and other lichens. The small Chilean population, however, exists exclusively as an epiphyte, typically in association with the lichen Ramalina usnea on various shrub species.

A rare lichen, the range of Teloschistes peruensis includes a few sites in Peru and one in Chile, with confirmed populations being exceptionally scarce. In Peru, reports from Otuzco in La Libertad are questionable; a historical specimen's collection site is potentially misreported, and recent identifications suggest a possible confusion with a different species, casting doubt on its presence in the region. In Callao, Lima, and Camaná, Arequipa, the species is considered extirpated, with habitats in Callao having been overtaken by urban development. The only verified existing population in Peru was found in the Lomas de Amara and Ullujaya in Ica Province, occupying a very limited area and discovered after meticulous surveys, including the use of aerial drones. Across the border in Chile, a tiny subpopulation persists at Pan de Azúcar, with only about 10 to 15 living individuals. This lichen's overall distribution is thus highly fragmented and limited, highlighting its vulnerability and the importance of its conservation.

== Conservation ==
Teloschistes peruensis has only two extant subpopulations: a small one in Pan de Azúcar, Chile, with 10 to 15 individuals covering less than 100 square metres (1,100 sq ft), and a larger, terrestrial subpopulation in the lomas of Amara and Ullujaya in Ica, Peru, comprising up to 100 individuals spread over an area under 1 square kilometre (0.4 sq mi), with an additional unconfirmed report from La Libertad, Peru.

Teloschistes peruensis is considered Critically Endangered by the IUCN. Threats to the lichen include potential development, habitat fragmentation, 4x4 races like the Dakar Rally, air pollution, and the presence of invasive species like goats and cows altering the habitat.
