= Oxneria ussuriensis =

Scientific classification
- Domain: Eukaryota
- Kingdom: Fungi
- Division: Ascomycota
- Class: Lecanoromycetes
- Order: Teloschistales
- Family: Teloschistaceae
- Genus: Oxneria
- Species: O. ussuriensis

Binomial name
- Oxneria ussuriensis S.Y.Kondr., S.O.Oh & Hur (2014)

Species of lichen

Oxneria ussuriensis is a species of corticolous, crustose lichen in the family Teloschistaceae. It is found in a single location in the Russian Far East.

== Taxonomy ==
The lichen was formally described as a new species in 2014 by lichenologists Sergey Kondratyuk, Soon-Ok Oh, and Jae-Seoun Hur. The type specimen was collected by the first author from a park in Kraskino (in the Khasansky District of Primorsky Krai), where he found it growing on a Populus tree. The species epithet refers to the type locality.

== Description ==
Oxneria ussuriensis has a deep orange to orange-yellow rosette-like thallus that has a diameter of 4–8 mm (0.16–0.31 in). The individual lobes comprising the thallus are 1.5–2 mm long, and have a width that ranges from 0.3 to 0.7 mm in the narrowest parts to 1 mm in the widest parts. The terminal parts of the lobes sometimes branch out to form secondary lobes or lobules. The underside of the lobes are covered with bluish-greyish soredia. Individual soredia are irregularly elongated and have a diameter from 20 to 50 μm; sometimes soredia aggregate into larger structures (consoredia) that are irregularly rounded with a diameter of 60–70 μm.

The apothecia made by Oxneria ussuriensis are lecanorine in form with a diameter of 0.6–1.7 mm and a bright orange disc that is either flat or somewhat concave. Ascospores have a narrow ellipsoidal shape and dimensions of 9–23 by 5.5–10 μm.

Xanthomendoza huculica, found in Ukraine, is somewhat similar in appearance and morphology to Oxneria ussuriensis, but X. huculica has a larger thallus (up to 3 cm wide) made of larger lobes (2.5–7 mm long and 0.3–0.7 mm wide), and its spores have a smaller length range (10–17 μm) and are thinner (5–7 μm).

== Habitat and distribution ==
Oxneria ussuriensis grows on the bark of roadside or parkland trees. It is only known from the type collection in the Russian Far East. Associated lichen species include Caloplaca ussuriensis, Candelaria concolor, Hyperphyscia adglutinosa, Phaeophyscia adiastola, Physconia detersa, and species from the genera Arthothelium, Lecanora, Phaeophyscia, Melaspilea, and Rinodina.
