= Teloschistes velifer =

Scientific classification
- Domain: Eukaryota
- Kingdom: Fungi
- Division: Ascomycota
- Class: Lecanoromycetes
- Order: Teloschistales
- Family: Teloschistaceae
- Genus: Teloschistes
- Species: T. velifer

Binomial name
- Teloschistes velifer F.Wilson (1889)

Synonyms
- Teloschistes chrysophthalmus var. fornicatus Müll.Arg. (1896); Teloschistes fasciculatus var. nodulosus Js.Murray (1960); Teloschistes velifer f. nodulosus (Js.Murray) Filson (1969)

Species of lichen

Teloschistes velifer is a species of corticolous (bark-dwelling), fruticose lichen in the family Teloschistaceae. It occurs in Australia, New Zealand, and South America.

== Taxonomy ==
The lichen was first described scientifically by the Australian minister and lichenologist, Francis Wilson, in 1889. He noted the rare lichen to prefer the bark of small twigs of the plant Hymenanthera banksii, a bush upon which it would often cover an entire side.

== Description ==
The Teloschistes velifer is characterised by its partially shrubby, upright thallus—this is the body of the lichen—which often forms dense, cushion-like patches approximately 10 mm in diameter. The upper surface of the thallus displays a radiating pattern and consists of elongated, linear lobes, each about 10 mm long and 1–2 mm wide. These lobes are slightly ridged and branch at their ends, featuring yellow, hair-like outgrowths known as fibrils that are about 0.5–1.5 mm long. The edges of the lobes often appear hooded and bear fine, greenish to greyish powdery clusters of reproductive cells known as soredia, which are exposed on the non-cortical underside of the lobes.

The upper side of the Teloschistes velifer is an orange-yellow colour, and when treated with potassium hydroxide (K), it turns purple. The underside is grey to whitish and mirrors the slight ridging observed on the upper side.

The reproductive structures, or apothecia, are about 1–3 mm in diameter and initially form broadly directly attached to the upper surface of the lobes, surrounded by conspicuous curved edges made of the same material as the thallus. Eventually, they appear to be terminal on 1–2 mm tall, ridged stalks and become convex with their margins no longer enclosed by fibrils. The disc of the apothecia is an orange-red colour with a matte texture. The asci, or spore-producing cells, are club-shaped and measure 50–60 by 12–15 μm. The ascospores themselves are two-chambered, ellipsoid, and range from 10 to 16 by 68 μm in size.
