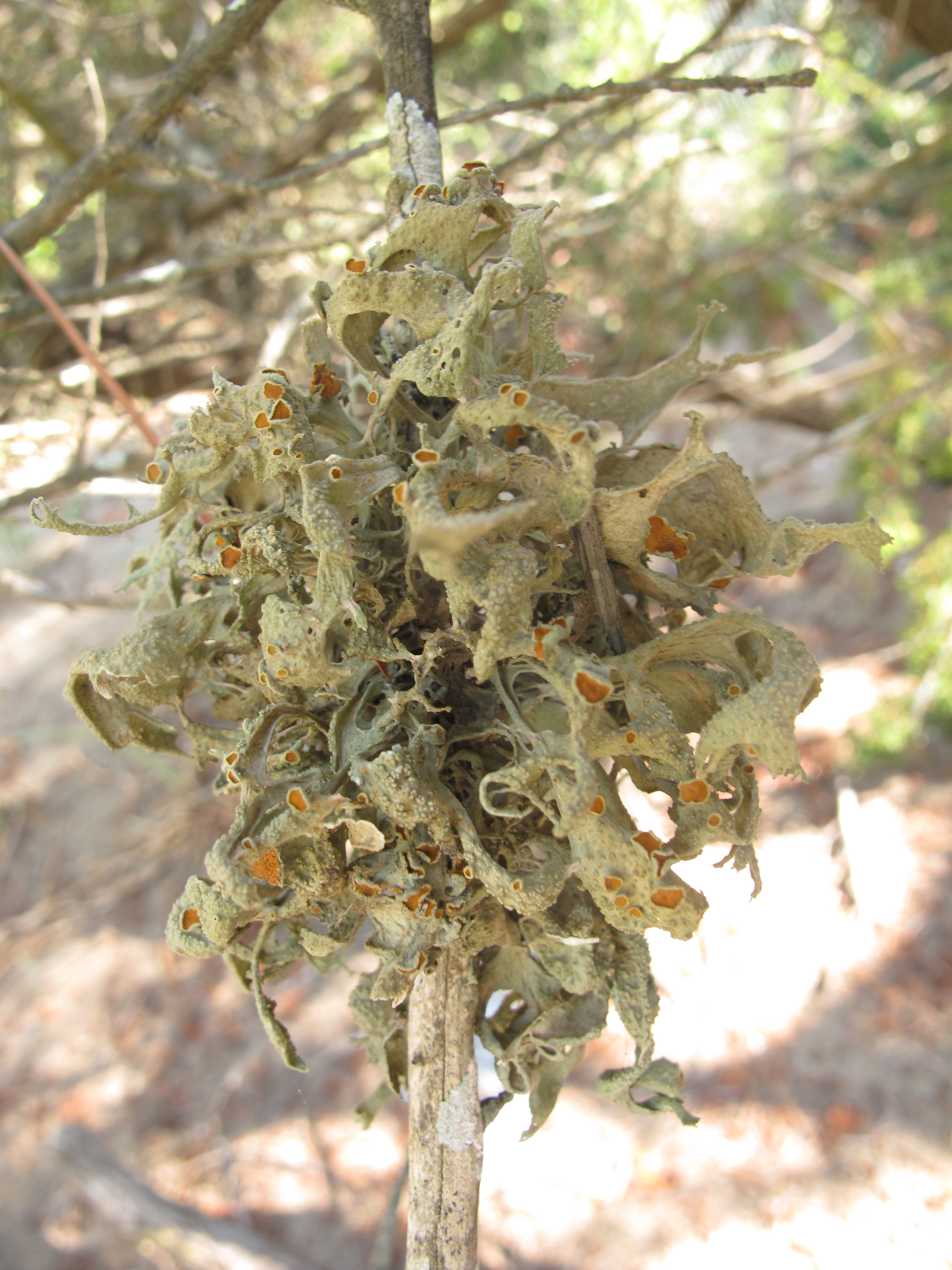
- Seirophora villosa

Scientific classification
- Kingdom: Fungi
- Division: Ascomycota
- Class: Lecanoromycetes
- Order: Teloschistales
- Family: Teloschistaceae
- Genus: Seirophora; Poelt (1983)

Type species
- Seirophora magara (Kremp.) Poelt (1983)

Synonyms
- Xanthoanaptychia S.Y.Kondr. & Kärnefelt (2003)

= Seirophora =

Genus of lichen-forming fungi

Seirophora is a genus of lichen-forming fungi in the family Teloschistaceae. It comprises nine species. The genus was erected in 1983, with Seirophora magara assigned as the type species. These lichens form small, shrubby growths with firm, cartilage-like branches that are stiffened by internal cord-like structures and covered with complex surface hairs rather than the simple root-like attachments found in related genera. Several species were transferred to Seirophora in 2004 when the genus was emended by Patrik Frödén and Per Lassen to include some species segregated from Teloschistes.

== Taxonomy ==
Seirophora was circumscribed by Josef Poelt in 1983 to accommodate Physcia magara Kremp., a teloschistaceous lichen from the northern Sinai that he regarded as related to Teloschistes but distinct in thallus anatomy. Poelt diagnosed the genus by a cartilaginous cortex that is not arranged in the usual surface-parallel fashion and by conspicuous scleroplectenchymatic cords in the medulla, and he made the combination Seirophora magara.

Patrik Frödén and Per Lassen later showed that the original material of Physcia magara is heterogeneous, consisting of a sterile portion of Ramalina maciformis and a fertile portion of Teloschistes villosus. To stabilise the name, they lectotypified P. magara on the T. villosus element, treating Krempelhuber's name as a synonym of Parmelia villosa Ach., which fixes the type concept of Seirophora to that species group. On that basis they emended Seirophora to include several species formerly placed in Teloschistes that share a suite of characters: absence of cilia or rhizines, multiseriate conglutinated hairs, spores with short septa, and a thick, strongly conglutinated cortex. They made the necessary new combinations, transferring (among others) S. aurantiaca, S. austroarabica, S. californica, S. contortuplicata, S. lacunosa, S. scorigena, S. stenophylla and S. villosa. They also noted that nuclear ribosomal internal transcribed spacer data supported the separation of Seirophora from Teloschistes, although the sequences cited were unpublished at the time.

== Description ==
Seirophora forms small, shrubby (fruticose) thalli with bushy, sometimes twisted branches, and a firm, cartilaginous outer cortex. The cortex is not arranged in the usual surface-parallel fashion; instead it is built from irregularly interwoven, densely "glued" hyphae, which explains the cartilage-like feel.

Beneath the cortex, one or more rounded, tightly fused hyphal strands ("scleroplectenchymatic cords") run through the medulla and may attach to the base of the fruiting bodies; these cords help stiffen the branches and probably aid water management. Species lack cilia or root-like rhizines; instead they produce surface hairs, typically of the complex multiseriate kind in which several rows of hyphae are tightly conglutinated. Simple, one-row hairs can also occur, but the strongly conglutinated multiseriate hairs are characteristic for the genus. The outer cortex itself is thick and strongly conglutinated; its hyphae remain virtually unchanged in potassium hydroxide solution, and the cortical hyphae and their walls are measurably thicker than in closely related Teloschistes.

The sexual fruiting bodies (apothecia) are lecanorine in form—that is, the orange disc sits within a rim of thallus-like tissue—and the rim can develop short, cartilaginous teeth or spines. The hymenium has slender, flexible paraphyses and club-shaped (clavate asci of the Teloschistes type. Ascospores are colourless and polaridiblastic (two cells joined by a narrow isthmus) with short septa typically about 2–4 μm long. Asexual spores (conidia), where reported, are rod-shaped to narrowly ellipsoid.

In standard spot tests the thallus is K− while the apothecial discs react K+ (crimson), and the genus falls within chemosyndrome A of the Teloschistaceae.

== Habitat and distribution ==
Poelt described the genus from the arid northern Sinai Peninsula, where thalli grow on desert shrubs. He interpreted the genus's distinctive internal cords as a water-storage adaptation suited to coastal-desert settings with episodic heavy dew, and he considered Seirophora among lichens confined to dry regions.

As emended by Frödén & Lassen, Seirophora is chiefly a northern-hemisphere genus, occurring across large parts of Asia, the southern fringes of Europe, northern Africa, and western North America, reaching the Canadian Arctic and Greenland; the only southern-hemisphere records they noted were outlying populations of S. villosa in Peru and Chile.

Across this range, species favour dry, open habitats where local air humidity is elevated (for example by dew or maritime fog), and they seldom cross the tropical and subtropical belts to establish beyond them; overall the pattern is Laurasian, in contrast with the Gondwanan bias of Teloschistes. Later work has added Central Asian species (e.g. S. tenera in 2005 and S. blumii in 2013).

== Species ==
As of October 2025, Species Fungorum (in the Catalogue of Life) accepts nine species of Seirophora:

- Seirophora austroarabica (Sipman) Frödén (2004)
- Seirophora blumii S.Y.Kondr. & Moniri (2013)
- Seirophora californica (Sipman) Frödén (2004)
- Seirophora lacunosa (Rupr.) Frödén (2004)
- Seirophora magara (Kremp.) Poelt (1983)
- Seirophora scorigena (Mont.) Frödén (2004)
- Seirophora stenophylla (Tav.) Frödén (2004)
- Seirophora tenera Frödén & Litterski (2005)
- Seirophora villosa (Ach.) Frödén (2004)

Three species once placed in this genus have since been reclassified in Xanthaptychia:

- Seirophora aurantiaca (R.Br.) Frödén (2004) = Xanthaptychia aurantiaca
- Seirophora contortuplicata (Ach.) Frödén (2004) = Xanthaptychia contortuplicata
- Seirophora orientalis Frödén (2005) = Xanthaptychia orientalis
