= Roderic Alfred Gregory =

British physiologist

Roderic Alfred Gregory CBE FRS (29 December 1913 – 5 September 1990) was a British physiologist.

== Early life and career ==
He was born in 1913 in Plaistow, Essex, the only child of Alfred Gregory and Alice Jane (née Greaves) Gregory. His father was a fitter and turner who, in 1913, was employed by Brunner and Mond (later Imperial Chemical Industries). At the age of 11 he started at the local grammar school, George Green's School.

He then trained as a physiologist in the Department of Physiology at University College London in the early 1930s and then studied gastrointestinal physiology for a PhD at Northwestern University, Illinois. He turned his attention to gastrin while he was Holt professor of physiology, and head of department, at the University of Liverpool (appointed in 1948). He "made fundamental contributions to the study of gut hormones through his isolation of the gastric acid stimulating hormone gastrin, the characterisation of its spectrum of actions, the identification of structure-activity relationships and discovery that gastrin was produced in excess in the tumours of patients with Zollinger–Ellison syndrome". Much of the work on gastrin at Liverpool was with his long-term collaborator Hilda Tracy in the same department.

== Awards and recognition ==
He was elected a Fellow of the Royal Society in 1965 and appointed a CBE in 1971. He won the Royal Medal in 1978.

== Personal life ==
He married Alice Watts in 1939.
