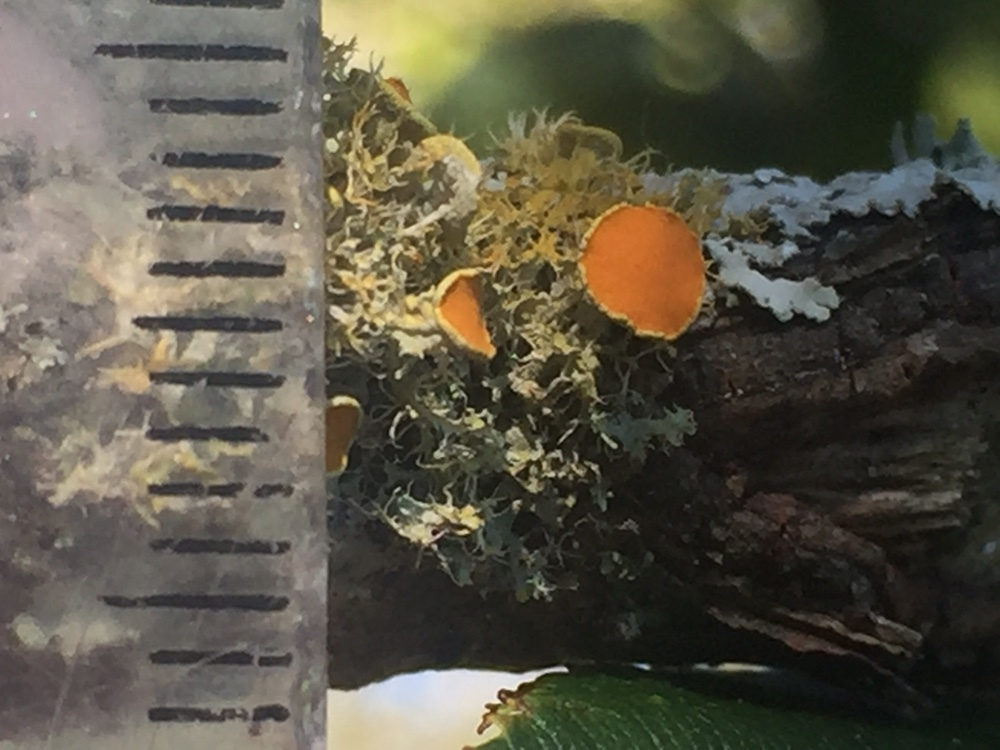

Scientific classification
- Domain: Eukaryota
- Kingdom: Fungi
- Division: Ascomycota
- Class: Lecanoromycetes
- Order: Teloschistales
- Family: Teloschistaceae
- Genus: Teloschistes
- Species: T. sieberianus

Binomial name
- Teloschistes sieberianus (Laurer) Hillmann (1930)

Synonyms
- List: Blasteniospora sieberiana (Laurer) Trevis. (1853); Parmelia sieberiana Laurer (1827); Physcia chrysophthalma var. sieberiana (Laurer) Shirley (1890); Physcia excelsior Stirt. (1899); Physcia sieberiana (Laurer) A.Massal. (1853); Teloschistes chrysophthalmus var. sieberianus (Laurer) Müll.Arg. (1883); Teloschistes excelsior (Stirt.) I.M.Lamb (1953)

= Teloschistes sieberianus =

Species of lichen

Teloschistes sieberianus is a species of corticolous (bark-dwelling), foliose lichen in the family Teloschistaceae. This Australasian species was formally described as new to science by Johann Friedrich Laurer in 1827, as Parmelia sieberiana. Johannes Hillmann transferred the taxon to the genus Teloschistes in 1930.

The lichen is found in the coastal wetlands of the East Australia coast, in the Australian Capital Territory, on Kaikōura Island (Great Barrier Island), and Kawau Island.
