= Solitaria (lichen) =

Scientific classification
- Domain: Eukaryota
- Kingdom: Fungi
- Division: Ascomycota
- Class: Lecanoromycetes
- Order: Teloschistales
- Family: Teloschistaceae
- Genus: Solitaria; Arup, Søchting & Frödén (2013)
- Species: S. chrysophthalma

Binomial name
- Solitaria chrysophthalma (Degel.) Arup, Søchting & Frödén (2013)

Synonyms
- List: Parmelia parietina f. citrinella Fr. (1831); Parmelia parietina var. citrinella (Fr.) Tuck. (1845); Placodium citrinellum (Fr.) Hepp (1857); Callopisma citrinum var. citrinellum (Fr.) Kremp. (1861); Physcia parietina ? citrinella (Fr.) Mudd (1861); Lecanora phlogina var. citrinella (Fr.) P.Crouan & H.Crouan (1867); Placodium citrinum var. citrinellum (Fr.) Rabenh. (1870); Callopisma citrinellum (Fr.) Arnold (1884); Xanthoria parietina var. citrinella (Fr.) Flagey (1896); Caloplaca citrinella (Fr.) Lettau (1912); Caloplaca chrysophthalma Degel. (1944)

Single-species lichen genus

Solitaria is a fungal genus in the family Teloschistaceae. It contains a single species, the corticolous (bark-dwelling), crustose lichen Solitaria chrysophthalma.

== Taxonomy ==
The species was first formally described in 1944 by Swedish lichenologist Gunnar Degelius, who named it Caloplaca chrysophthalma. It had been known by several other names before this. Ulf Arup and colleagues transferred the taxon to its own genus in 2013, following a molecular phylogenetics-based restructuring of the family Teloschistaceae.

== Description ==
Solitaria chrysophthalma is characterised by a thallus with a yellowish-green to grey hue, which extends between 90 and 100 mm. The vegetative tissue ranges from continuous to dispersed areolate patterns, with areoles initially appearing low and flat but occasionally slightly raised. Its cortex measures between 15 and 30 mm and houses a necral layer. Soralia, specialised reproductive propagules, are well-defined, either round or irregular in shape, and contain finely textured soredia with vibrant shades of yellowish-green to yellow-orange.

Infrequently, the lichen bears apothecia, flat reproductive structures where spores develop. These structures are coloured dark orange to bright orange, have a diameter of 0.3 to 0.7 mm, and may have a yellowish outer thalline margin. The hymenium, a fertile portion of the apothecia, varies in depth between 55 and 85 μm. It contains features like irregular hyphae or undefined oval cells. The asci, a compartment where spores mature, contains eight spores, each with two compartments (lumina). The lichen displays a red reaction when treated with a solution of potassium hydroxide, both on its thallus and epihymenium.

=== Similar species ===
Solitaria chrysophthalma and Lendemeriella lucifuga are lichen species that, while bearing some resemblances, exhibit distinct characteristics. Solitaria chrysophthalma is notable for its thicker, epiphloedal thallus with colours ranging from grey to various shades of yellow. This species occasionally presents an immersed thallus with scattered, light-yellow soralia. Furthermore, its soralia are bright orange-yellow, and it has bright orange apothecia, although not consistently. A key distinguishing feature is the absence of algal cell clusters in a cross-section of Solitaria chrysophthalma, a feature present in Lendemeriella lucifuga. In terms of chemical attributes, the former contains parietin as a dominant substance, supplemented by minor quantities of emodin and fragilin, and lacks fallacinal, which is found in the latter.

== Habitat and distribution ==
Solitaria chrysophthalma has been recorded in China and northern Europe. In North America, it occurs in central and eastern United States and Canada. It usually grows on bark, but, rarely, it is found on moss. Its range extends from southern Ontario south to Oklahoma and the mountains of northern Georgia and South Carolina.
