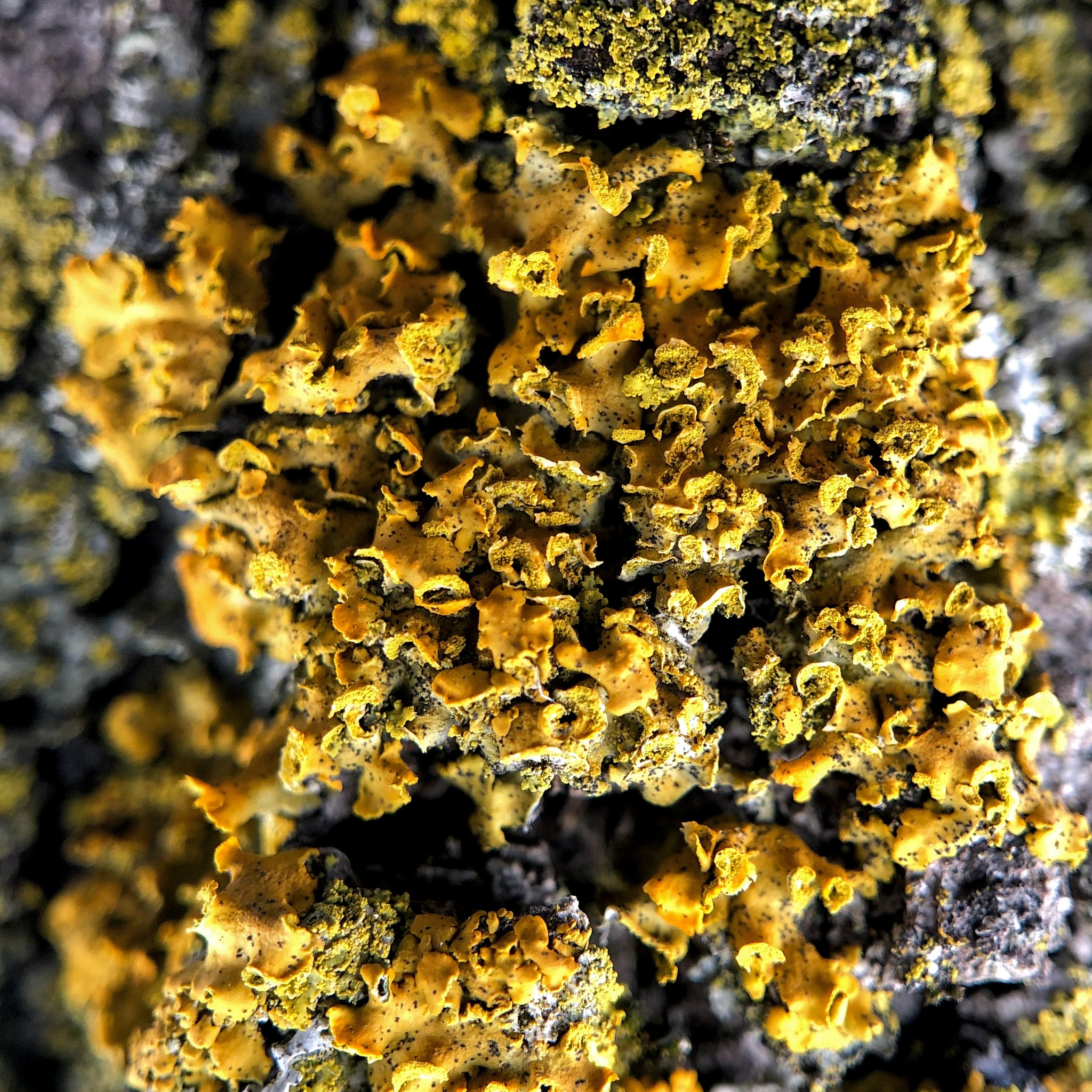
- Oxneria fallax

Scientific classification
- Kingdom: Fungi
- Division: Ascomycota
- Class: Lecanoromycetes
- Order: Teloschistales
- Family: Teloschistaceae
- Genus: Oxneria; S.Y.Kondr. & Kärnefelt (2003)

Type species
- Oxneria alfredii (S.Y.Kondr. & Poelt) S.Y.Kondr. & Kärnefelt (2003)

Species
- O. alfredii O. fallax O. imshaugii O. soechtingii O. ussuriensis

= Oxneria =

Genus of lichens

Oxneria is a genus of foliose lichens in the family Teloschistaceae. It has five species. These leafy lichens are characterised by their orange, yellow, or reddish colouration from anthraquinone pigments and their abundant root-like attachment structures (rhizines). The genus was established in 2003 as part of a major revision that split the traditional Xanthoria group into several distinct genera, with Oxneria showing its greatest diversity in North America.

== Taxonomy ==
The genus was circumscribed in 2003 by Sergey Kondratyuk and Ingvar Kärnefelt, with Oxneria alfredii assigned as the type species. The generic name honours the Ukrainian lichenologist Alfred Mycolayovych Oxner.

Oxneria was one of three genera established in that study, which revised natural groups within the xanthorioid lichens (Teloschistaceae). Kondratyuk and Kärnefelt recognised that species traditionally placed in Xanthoria and allied genera were not a single coherent group, and split them into Oxneria, Rusavskia, and Xanthoanaptychia. Their decision was based on comparative analysis of morphology, anatomy, and chemistry, particularly the structure of the thallus and apothecia, the type of attachment structures (rhizines), and the form of spermatia.

The authors transferred 21 previously described species into Oxneria. Many of these were formerly treated in Xanthoria, including well-known taxa such as O. fallax, O. montana, O. oregonica, and O. ulophyllodes. The centre of diversity for the genus was noted to be North America, although species also occur in South America, Europe, and Asia. This distribution pattern was interpreted as reflecting biogeographic history, with greater species persistence in North America during glacial cycles, while Eurasian and Australasian fungas were more strongly reduced.

== Description ==
Species of Oxneria are foliose lichens, meaning they form leafy lobes rather than crusts or shrubby tufts. The lobes are usually loosely attached to their substrate, with both upper and lower layers built from a type of fungal tissue known as paraplectenchyma. Root-like attachment structures (rhizines) are abundant and typically of the Xanthoria-type, while the fruiting discs (apothecia) are round, sessile, and have a rim of tissue that matches the thallus in colour (a thalline margin). The apothecial wall (true exciple) is composed of pseudoprosoplectenchymatous tissue, and the spore-bearing layer is of the Lecanora-type.

The reproductive sacs (asci) usually contain eight ascospores, and the vegetative propagules (minute rod-shaped spermatia, sometimes called conidia in lichens) are straight, long, and rod-shaped (bacilliform). Chemical tests show that Oxneria species characteristically produce anthraquinone pigments, which give the thallus its orange, yellow, or reddish colouration. These pigments place the genus in chemosyndrome A, the same chemical group as many other members of the Teloschistaceae. Overall, the combination of its abundant rhizines, distinctive tissue structure, and spore morphology sets Oxneria apart from related xanthorioid genera such as Xanthomendoza and Rusavskia.

== Species ==
As of September 2025, Species Fungorum (in the Catalogue of Life) accepts five species of Oxneria:

- Oxneria alfredii (S.Y.Kondr. & Poelt) S.Y.Kondr. & Kärnefelt (2003)
- Oxneria fallax (Arnold) S.Y.Kondr. & Kärnefelt (2003)
- Oxneria imshaugii S.Y.Kondr. (2022)
- Oxneria soechtingii (S.Y.Kondr.) S.Y.Kondr. & Kärnefelt (2003)
- Oxneria ussuriensis S.Y.Kondr., S.O.Oh & Hur (2014)
