= Teloschistes inflatus =

Scientific classification
- Domain: Eukaryota
- Kingdom: Fungi
- Division: Ascomycota
- Class: Lecanoromycetes
- Order: Teloschistales
- Family: Teloschistaceae
- Genus: Teloschistes
- Species: T. inflatus

Binomial name
- Teloschistes inflatus Frödén (2007)

Species of lichen

Teloschistes inflatus is a species of corticolous (bark-dwelling), fruticose lichen in the family Teloschistaceae. Found in Cape Province, South Africa, it was formally described as a new species in 2007 by the lichenologist Patrik Frödén.
