= Nicky Cullum =

Dame Nicky Cullum DBE
- Born: Nicola Anne Cullum; 6 June 1962 (age 64); Leeds, England, UK
- Education: University of Liverpool (BSc, PhD, RGN)
- Awards: DBE (2013); FMedSci (2012); FAAN (2012)
- Scientific career
- Fields: Wounds; Leg ulcers; Pressure ulcers; Nursing
- Workplaces: University of Manchester; NIHR; University of York; University of Surrey
- Thesis: Nerve cytoskeletal proteins in diabetes mellitus (1990)
- Website: www.manchester.ac.uk/research/nicky.cullum

Dame Nicola Anne Cullum DBE (born 6 June 1962) is a Professor of Nursing at the University of Manchester.

== Education ==
Cullum was educated at the University of Liverpool where she was awarded a Bachelor of Science degree in Pharmacology in 1984 and a Doctor of Philosophy degree in Pharmacology in 1990. She became a Registered General Nurse (RGN) in 1985.

== Research and career ==
Cullum completed postdoctoral research at the University of Surrey and the University of Liverpool. Between 1994 and 2011 she worked at the University of York. Her research is primarily on wound care. Since 2011 she has worked at the University of Manchester. Since 2019 she has led the NIHR Applied Research Collaboration for Greater Manchester.

== Awards and honours ==
Cullum was made Dame Commander of the Order of the British Empire for services to nursing research and wound care in the 2013 Birthday Honours. She was an inaugural National Institute for Health Research (NIHR) Senior Investigator (2008–2012, renewed 2013) and was made a Fellow of both the Academy of Medical Sciences (FMedSci) and the American Academy of Nursing (FAAN) in 2012.

== Publications ==
Cullum has over 200 articles listed on Web of Science that have been cited over 6000 times giving her an h-index of 49. Her top three most cited articles are:

- Sheldon, T; Cullum, N; Dawson, D; Lankshear, A; Lowson, K; Watt, I; West, P; Wright, D; Wright, J (2004). "What's the evidence that NICE guidance has been implemented? Results from a national evaluation using time series analysis, audit of patients' notes, and interviews". BMJ. 329 (7473): 999–1103. doi:10.1136/bmj.329.7473.999. PMC 524545. PMID 15514342.
- O'Meara, S; Cullum, N; Nelson, EA; Dumville, JC (2012). "Compression for venous leg ulcers". Cochrane Database of Systematic Reviews. 14 (11) CD000265. doi:10.1002/14651858.CD000265.pub3. PMC 7068175. PMID 23152202.
- Fletcher, A; Cullum, N; Sheldon, TA (1997). "A systematic review of compression treatment for venous leg ulcers". BMJ. 315 (7108): 576–580. doi:10.1136/bmj.315.7108.576. PMC 2127398. PMID 9302954.
