= George Wallace Kenner =

British organic chemist

George Wallace Kenner FRS (16 November 1922 – 26 June 1978) was a British organic chemist. He was born in Sheffield in 1922, the son of Professor James Kenner. During his childhood, he went to Didsbury Preparatory School in 1928 and moved to Manchester Grammar School in 1934. He was appointed to the first Heath Harrison Chair of Organic Chemistry at the University of Liverpool 1957–1976. He did his MSc and PhD degrees under Lord Todd at Manchester and Cambridge Universities in the UK. He married Jillian Bird in 1951 and they had two daughters both born in Cambridge. He was faculty member at Cambridge University for 11 years before moving to the University of Liverpool in 1957 as Heath Harrison Professor of Organic Chemistry.

== Achievements ==
George Kenner contributed to many areas of organic chemistry. In the 1960s, George Kenner, R.A. Gregory and Hilda Tracy were involved in the seminal discovery and synthesis of the peptide hormone gastrin at the University of Liverpool. Gastrin is involved in secretion of gastric acid (HCl) in the stomach.

The first chemical synthesis of a lysozyme-like enzyme of 129 amino acids using the classical approach was attempted by Kenner and his group at the University of Liverpool in the 1970s. This would have been the largest protein molecule synthesised in a laboratory using classical peptide synthesis up to that time. He carefully planned a convergent synthesis of this lysozyme analogue, containing 129 amino acid residues joined in a rigorously defined order. The efforts of Kenner and his group led to the synthesis of the 129 amino acid peptide chain in protected form. But the dream of making a wholly synthetic lysozyme enzyme was only achieved 30 years later, in 2007. This synthesis of functionally active lysozyme was achieved by a single individual, Thomas Durek, working in Steve B. Kent's group at the University of Chicago. The value of George Kenner's contributions to the methodology of peptide chemistry had profound influence on developments in many biomedicine fields. For example it led to the synthesis of antigens of defined geometry for immunological studies.

Kenner's work was recognised by the awards of the Meldola Medal (1951) and the Corday-Morgan Medal (1957) and in distinguished lectureships such as Tilden (1955), Simonsen (1972) and Pedler (1976) of the Chemical Society of whose Perkin Division he was President from 1974 to 1976. He was also President of Section B of the British Association for the Advancement of Science in 1974. Elected a Fellow of the Royal Society in 1964 he was the Society's Bakerian Lecturer for 1976 and was elected to a Royal Society Research Professorship in 1976.

== The Kenner Prize and Awards at University of Liverpool ==
The George Kenner Prize and Lectureship was established in 1979 with a sum of £12,000 raised by subscription to commemorate the late Professor GW Kenner, Heath Harrison Professor of Organic Chemistry from 1957 to 1976 and Royal Society Professor from 1977 to 1978. The duty of the Lectureship recipient is to deliver lectures on subjects related to the study of Organic Chemistry at the University. The first of these lectures was held on 28 October 1980. Lord Todd introduced the speaker, George Kenner's former research collaborator and lifelong friend Har Gobind Khorana, Nobel prizewinner and Professor at the Massachusetts Institute of Technology. Other famous organic chemists awarded the honour of the George Kenner Lectureship include Gilbert Stork, Ryoji Noyori, Steven V. Ley, Albert Eschenmoser, John George Adami, Duilio Arigoni, and Jean-Marie Lehn. The George W. Kenner Award for graduate students was established at the University of Liverpool in 2006 to commemorate Kenner. The award is annually given to the first-year PhD student in the organic section of the Department of Chemistry who is the best in both academic and research performance.
