= James Murray (lichenologist) =

New Zealand organic chemist and lichenologist

- Born: 1923
- Died: 1961 (aged 37–38)
- Scientific career
- Institutions: University of Otago
- Author abbrev. (botany): Js.Murray

James Murray (1923–1961) was an organic chemist at the University of Otago. He was the first twentieth-century lichenologist in New Zealand.

== Career ==
James Murray worked at the University of Otago in Dunedin as a senior lecturer in chemistry.

Murray began research with lichens in the 1950s, applying his knowledge and skills in plant secondary compounds as well as morphology. This was the first systematic work on the lichens of New Zealand since the 1890s. He revised the New Zealand lichens within the Coniocarpineae, Peltigeraceae, Teloschistaceae among others, as well as lichens from the Antarctic and Subantarctic regions.

He spent 1959 on sabbatical working with the chemist Derek Barton at Imperial College, University of London. During this visit Murray also met with Peter James, a lichen specialist at the Natural History Museum, London. There were extensive nineteenth-century specimens of New Zealand lichens at both this museum and at Royal Botanic Gardens, Kew. Murray was able to work with these specimens and with James. They began to define the genus Sticta more precisely, distinguishing it from Pseudocyphellaria and also other groups such as Menegazzia, Nephroma, the Pannariaceae and the Parmeliaceae that contained more species in the Southern Hemisphere. Murray also visited several other lichenologists in France and Sweden including Henri Des Abbayes, Michael Mitchell, Greta Du Rietz, Adolf Hugo Magnusson, Gunnar Degelius, Rolf Santesson and Einar Timdall. He returned to New Zealand in February 1961.

After his death, his lichen specimens (over 10,000), notes and papers were donated to University of Otago and Peter James was seconded in 1962 to curate the collection. Murray's work on the natural products of lichens contributed to developments in this area and also became important to definition of genera in the Lobariaceae. He developed keys to New Zealand lichen genera, some published posthumously.

== Personal life ==
Murray was married to Audrey. He died in a car accident on 24 June 1961.

== Publications ==
Murray was the author or co-author of scientific publications about organic chemistry and lichens. Some of his most significant were:

- James Murray (1959) Studies of New Zealand Lichens. I—The Coniocarpineae Transactions of the Royal Society of New Zealand 88 (2) 177 - 195
- James Murray (1960) Studies of New Zealand Lichens. II—The Teloschistaceae Transactions of the Royal Society of New Zealand 88 (2) 197 - 210
- James Murray (1960) Studies on New Zealand Lichens Part III.–The Family Peltigeraceae Transactions of the Royal Society of New Zealand 88 (3) 381 - 399
- James Murray (1962) Keys to New Zealand lichens. Part 1. Tuatara 10 (3) 120 - 128 (published posthumously)
- James Murray (1963) Keys to New Zealand lichens. Part 2. Tuatara 11 (1) 46 - 56 (published posthumously)
- James Murray (1963) Keys to New Zealand lichens. Part 2. Tuatara 11 (2) 98 - 109 (published posthumously)

== See also ==
- Category:Taxa named by James Murray (lichenologist)
