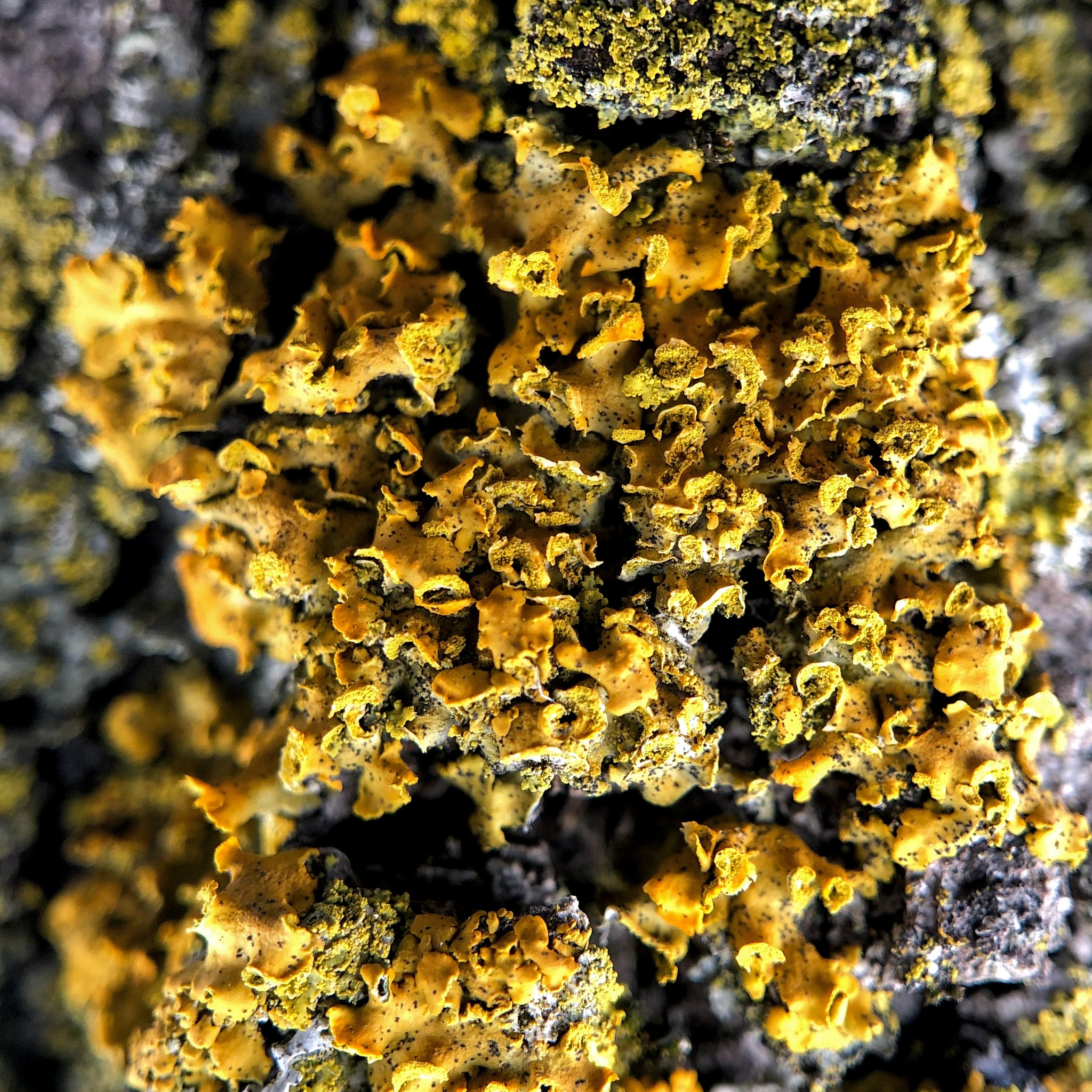

Scientific classification
- Kingdom: Fungi
- Division: Ascomycota
- Class: Lecanoromycetes
- Order: Teloschistales
- Family: Teloschistaceae
- Genus: Oxneria
- Species: O. fallax

Binomial name
- Oxneria fallax (Arnold) S.Y.Kondr. & Kärnefelt (2003)

Synonyms
- Physcia fallax Hepp ex Arnold (1858); Xanthoria fallax Arnold (1881); Xanthomendoza fallax Søchting, Kärnefelt & S.Y.Kondr. (2002); Placodium fallax Hepp (1860); Xanthoria lychnea var. fallax (Hepp) Stein (1879)

= Oxneria fallax =

Species of lichen-forming fungus

Oxneria fallax, also known as the hooded sunburst lichen, is a small yellow-orange to red-orange foliose lichen that grows on bark or rarely on rock or bone. It is found all over the world except very dry areas. In Nepal, O. fallax has been reported from 3,200 to 3,400 m elevation in a compilation of published records.

The non-fruiting body (thallus) grows in rosettes to 3 cm in diameter. The rosettes sometimes coalesce with each other. The lobes may appear divided at the tips. It is sometimes tightly appressed to the substrate (adnate), and sometimes not. The fruiting bodies (apothecia) are lecanorine, meaning that they are disc-like with a ring or rim of tissue around the disc that is made of tissue similar to the thallus. The tips of the lobes form hood shaped soralia that produce powdery greenish yellow soredia. It prefers growing on elm or oak bark, but can also be found on rocks, bone, or other wood types. In Norway, it has been recorded growing on the bark of various sun-exposed broadleaved trees, including Acer, Betula, Fagus, Fraxinus, Populus, Tilia, and Ulmus. Lichen spot tests on the surface are K+ (purple), C−, KC−, and P−.
