= T. R. Seshadri =

Indian chemist (1900–1975)

T. R. Seshadri FNA, FRS
- Born: Thiruvenkata Rajendra Seshadri; 3 February 1900; Kulithalai, Tiruchirappalli District, Madras Presidency, British India (now in Karur District, Tamil Nadu, India)
- Died: 27 September 1975 (aged 75); New Delhi, India
- Education: Presidency College, Madras
- Known for: Work on Indian pharmacology, oxygen heterocyclic compounds
- Awards: INSA Shanti Swarup Bhatnagar Medal; INSA Meghnad Saha Medal; ICS Acharya Prafulla Chandra Ray Medal; ICS Acharya Jnanendra Ghosh Medal; Fellow of the Indian National Science Academy (FNA) (1942); Fellow of the Royal Society (FRS) (1960); Padma Bhushan (1963); President of the Indian National Science Academy (1967-68)
- Scientific career
- Fields: Organic chemistry Pharmacology
- Workplaces: University of Madras; Victoria University of Manchester; University of Graz; University of Edinburgh; Agricultural College and Research Institute, Coimbatore (now Tamil Nadu Agricultural University); Andhra University; University of Delhi
- Doctoral advisor: Robert Robinson

Thiruvengadam Rajendram Seshadri FNA, FRS was an Indian chemist, academic, writer and the Head of the Department of Chemistry at the University of Delhi, known for his researches on the Indian medicinal and other plants. He was a Fellow of the Royal Society, UK and an elected member of the German Academy of Sciences Leopoldina. Besides several articles, he also published two books, Chemistry of Vitamins and Hormones and Advancement of Scientific and Religious Culture in India. The Government of India awarded him the third highest civilian honour of the Padma Bhushan, in 1963, for his contributions to Science.

== Biography ==
Money and materials alone do not secure good research, they are only adjuncts and it is the human element behind them that matters, said T. R. Seshadri.

Seshadri was born on 3 February 1900 at Kulithalai, an ancient village with history dating back to the Cholas of the 9th century CE, in the present-day Karur district of the south Indian state of Tamil Nadu, in a Brahmin family, to Namagiri Ammal and Thiruvengadatha Iyengar, a school teacher, as the third of their five sons. After his primary schooling at the local school in his village, he did his high school studies at the temple town of Srirangam as well as at the National College Higher Secondary School, Tiruchirappalli and joined Presidency College, Madras in 1917 for his graduate studies (BSc honours) which was completed in 1920 with financial assistance from the Ramakrishna Mission. After graduation, he worked with the Mission for a year, but continued his studies at Presidency College for his master's degree and thereafter, for research under the renowned chemist, Biman Bihari Dey, during which period he won two research awards, the Curzon Prize and the William Wedderburn Prize, from the University of Madras. He secured a scholarship from the state government in 1927 for higher studies at University of Manchester where he did his doctoral research under the guidance of the renowned British chemist and Nobel Laureate, Robert Robinson, to secure a PhD in 1929. He was a colleague of K. Venkataraman. His researches at Manchester were focused on the development of anti-malarial drugs and synthesis of compounds. Before returning to India in 1930, he had short training stints in Austria on organic microanalysis with Fritz Pregl, a Nobel laureate, and in Edinburgh on the alkaloid retrorsine with George Barger, a Royal Society fellow.

Back in India, he continued his work on plant chemistry as a research scholar of the University of Madras at Government College of Agriculture, Coimbatore where he stayed for four years. In 1934, he joined Andhra University, Waltair, as the Reader and Head of the Department of Chemistry and served the university for 15 years. During his tenure there, he set up several laboratories and a research school on flavanoids, while continuing his own researches. He also established two new departments in the university, viz. Department of Chemical Technology and Department of Pharmaceutical Chemistry. The onset of World War II in 1941 affected his work as the chemicals were short in supply and the department of chemistry at the university was taken over by the British Army, which forced him to move first to Guntur in 1942 and then to Madras in 1943. It was only in 1946, after the war ended, he could return to Waltair, when the laboratories, which suffered damages during the war, were rebuilt.

After the Indian independence, Maurice Gwyer, the then vice chancellor of the University of Delhi, a former Chief Justice of India and the founder of Miranda House, invited Seshadri to join the Delhi University as the Head of the Department of Chemistry in 1949. Accepting the offer, he established a new research school there where researches were primarily focused on natural products, such as terpenoids, alkaloids and quinonoids. The school is known to have attracted research students from India and abroad where he guided a research team, composed of post-doctoral research scholars from England, France and Germany, besides India. He worked at the university till his superannuation in 1965, upon which he was made the first professor emeritus of the university. In between, he was offered the post of the Chairman of the University Grants Commission but he did not accept it. He served as Provost of the Jubilee Hall, University of Delhi from 1952 to 1956. He continued his researches for seven more years, till 1972, when ill health, among other issues such as stoppage of research grants, forced an end to his active career. He lived for three more years, mostly battling ill health, reportedly in poverty, and died, at the age of 75, on 27 September 1975. The story of life has been published by Resonance, a journal of the Indian Academy of Sciences, under the title, Professor T R Seshadri — An Acharaya par excellence.

== Legacy ==
Some of the notable contributions of Seshadri are on the academic administration front. As the head of the Chemistry department at Andhra University, he was instrumental in the establishment of several laboratories, two new departments and a research school. He founded another research school at Delhi University which soon became a centre of excellence in chemical research, under the name Centre for Advanced Study for the Chemistry of Natural Products where he served as the head from 1949 to 1975. He is credited with pioneering research on plant chemistry, primarily in oxygen heterocyclics, and contributed to the isolation and structural elucidation of flavanoid pigments. His studies on aglucones and glucosides resulted in the development of a new method of methylation for the degradation study of the pigments. His researches also focused on demethylation, hydrogenation, dehydrogenation, nuclear methylation, allylation, prenylation, among other topics. His researches and work experiences have been documented by way of over 1000 articles and two books, Chemistry of Vitamins and Hormones and Advancement of Scientific and Religious Culture in India. He mentored 160 students in their doctoral studies and, on his retirement, donated all the books in his personal library to the Chemistry department of the Delhi University.

Seshadri, who was a member of the scientific advisory committee to the Government of India and UNESCO, served as an expert advisor to several government agencies such as the Council of Scientific and Industrial Research, Indian Council of Medical Research, Indian Council of Agricultural Research and Department of Atomic Energy and chaired many expert committees related to education, health and science. He was the president of the Indian National Science Academy (INSA) (1967–68) and the Indian Academy of Sciences (IAS) and was a member of the editorial boards of the Indian Journal of Chemistry and two international journals, Tetrahedron and Phytochemistry. He also served as the president of organizations such as the Indian Chemical Society, Indian Pharmaceutical Association, Oil Technology Association, the North India chapter of the Royal Institute of Chemistry, London, Indian Pharmaceutical Congress and Indian Science Congress Association (1966–67).

== Awards and honours ==
Seshadri received doctorates (honoris causa) from Andhra University, Banaras Hindu University, Osmania University and Delhi University, honorary professorship from Andhra University and Osmania University, and was a Cooch-Behar Professor of the Indian Association for the Cultivation of Science (IACS), Kolkata. He delivered several award orations including H. K. Sen Lecture of the Institution of Chemists (India), B. C. Guha Lecture of the Indian Science Congress Association, B. M. Singh Lecture of the Panjab University and K. Venkataraman Lecture of the University of Mumbai. The Indian National Science Academy elected him as their Fellow in 1942, which preceded elected fellowships from Indian Academy of Sciences in 1954 and Royal Society, London in 1960. A year later, the German Academy of Sciences Leopoldina elected him as their member in 1961. The Government of India awarded him the civilian honour of the Padma Bhushan in 1963. He was also a recipient of Meghnad Saha Medal of the Indian National Science Academy and two awards from the Indian Chemical Society viz. Acharya Prafulla Chandra Ray Medal and Acharya Gnanendra Ghosh Medal. INSA has instituted Professor Tiruvenkata Rajendra Seshadri Seventieth Birthday Commemoration Medal and Delhi University conducts Prof. T. R. Seshadri Memorial Lecture, an annual oration, in his honour.

== Bibliography ==
- Srinivasa Rangaswami, Tiruvenkata Rajendra Seshadri (1952). Chemistry of Vitamins and Hormones. Andhra University. p. 467. OCLC 14654195.
- T. R. Seshadri (1971). Advancement of scientific and religious culture in India. Andhra University Press. ASIN B0017XMAPW.

== See also ==
- List of University of Delhi people
- Presidency College, Chennai
