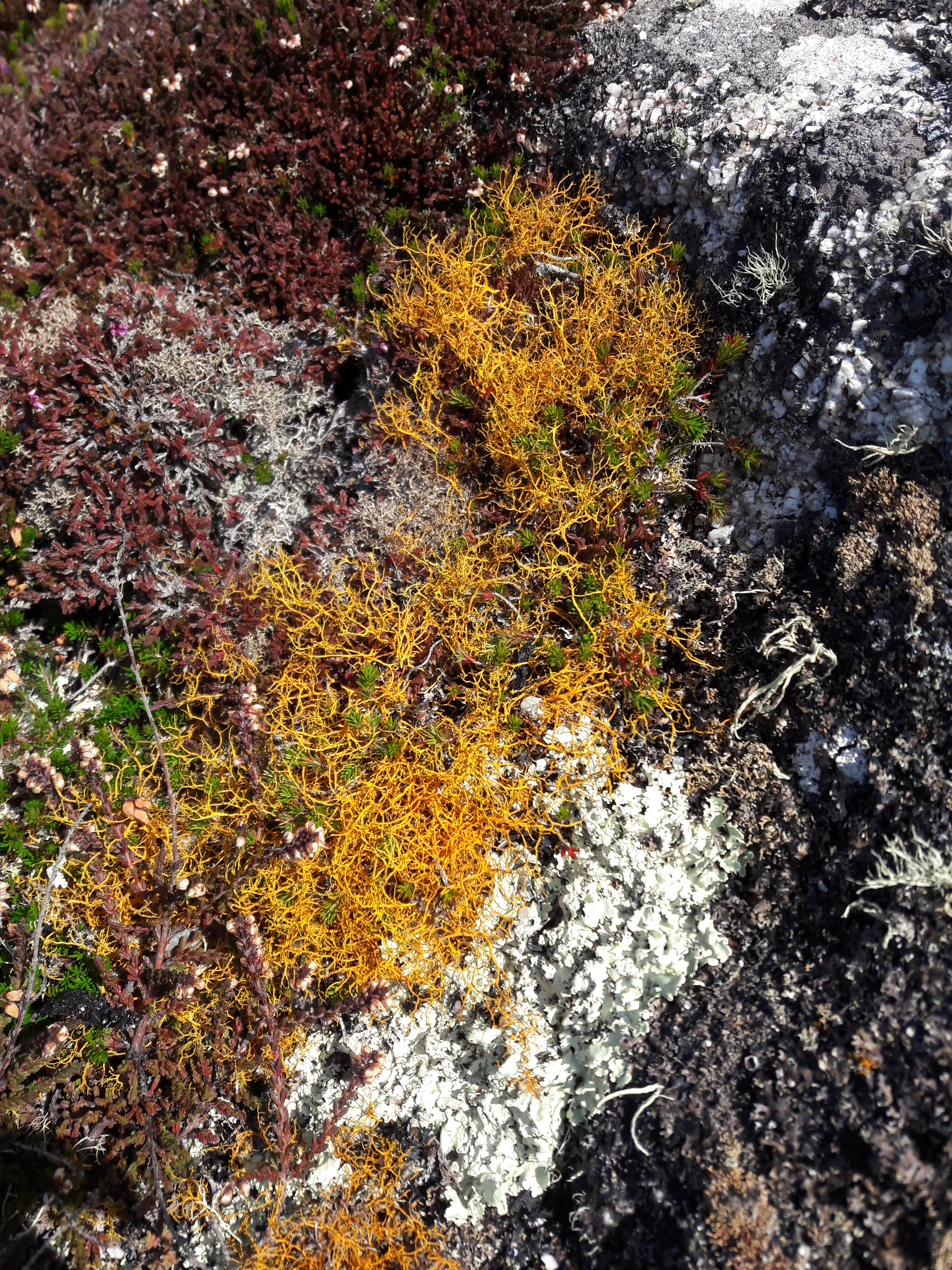

Conservation status
- Apparently Secure (NatureServe)

Scientific classification
- Domain: Eukaryota
- Kingdom: Fungi
- Division: Ascomycota
- Class: Lecanoromycetes
- Order: Teloschistales
- Family: Teloschistaceae
- Genus: Teloschistes
- Species: T. flavicans

Binomial name
- Teloschistes flavicans (Sw.) Norman (1852)

Synonyms
- List: Lichen flavicans Sw. (1788); Physcia flavicans DC.; Borreri flavicans (Sw.) Ach.; Parmelia flavicans (Tuck.); Parmelia perlata var. flavicans Tuck.

= Teloschistes flavicans =

Species of fungus

Teloschistes flavicans, also known as the golden hair-lichen, is a lichenized species of fungus in the genus Teloschistes (meaning "split-ends"; a reference to its finely divided thallus and dense coils which appear almost like brillopads), family Teloschistaceae. Recognized by its saffron-coloured pigmentation, this widespread fruticose lichen grows on rocks and branches of trees.

== Taxonomy ==
It was first named and scientifically described in 1788 by the Swedish botanist Olof Swartz, who called it Lichen flavicans. Johannes Norman transferred it to the genus Teloschistes in 1852.

== Development ==
Teloschistes flavicans has a distinctive growth pattern characterized by the formation of cilia (specialized fungal outgrowths) at its branch tips. The thallus (body) of the lichen grows from recurved (curved inward) apices that contain both fungal cells and photobiont (algal) cells in an unstratified arrangement. These growing points give rise to both the main branches and the characteristic cilia.

The development of cilia begins with the appearance of a small, deeply orange-colored spot on the recurved surface of a branch tip. This develops into a primordium (early developmental structure) composed of elongated fungal hyphae that converge at the tip. Unlike the main branches, cilia contain no photobiont cells. Each cilium reaches a final length of 0.3–1 mm. While cilia can sometimes function as attachment structures by forming connections to substrates like bryophyte leaves or other lichens, this appears to occur in only a small proportion of cases.

The formation of a cilium typically coincides with the bifurcation (splitting) of the growing point into two new branches. When a cilium develops, the photobiont cells and associated fungal tissue are displaced to either side of its base, creating two new growing points. These initially face in opposite directions, creating a characteristic fleur-de-lis pattern. New cilia often form at the tips of these branches before they elongate significantly, leading to further bifurcation.

The branching pattern of T. flavicans often shows a regular arrangement, with successive branches forming at right angles to each other, creating a roughly cruciate (cross-shaped) pattern. This organized growth pattern is most evident in the younger, terminal portions of the thallus. In older parts, secondary branches arising from damaged areas or specialized reproductive structures (soralia) can obscure this regular pattern. While cilia typically form centrally between branch points, they can occasionally develop asymmetrically from one side of a growing point, resulting in deflected rather than bifurcated growth.
