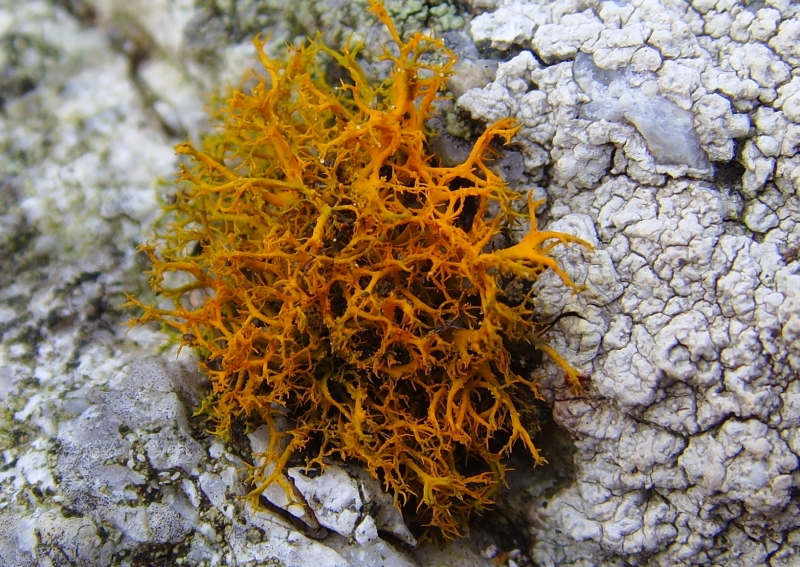
- Teloschistes flavicans

Scientific classification
- Kingdom: Fungi
- Division: Ascomycota
- Class: Lecanoromycetes
- Order: Teloschistales
- Family: Teloschistaceae
- Genus: Teloschistes; Norman (1853)

Type species
- Teloschistes flavicans (Sw.) Norman (1853)

Species
- See text

Synonyms
- Borrera Ach. (1809); Tenorea Tornab. (1848); Theloschistes Th.Fr. (1861); Teloschistomyces Cif. & E.A.Thomas (1953)

= Teloschistes =

Genus of lichen-forming fungi

Teloschistes is a genus of lichen-forming fungi in the family Teloschistaceae, of which it is the namesake. Species of Teloschistes are among the most visually striking lichens, typically forming small, bushy, much-branched growths in vivid shades of yellow to orange, colours produced by anthraquinone pigments, particularly parietin. The genus has a worldwide distribution, with species occurring on twigs, bark, and rock surfaces in open, well-lit habitats ranging from coastal scrub and semi-arid shrublands to alpine zones.

== Taxonomy ==
The genus Teloschistes was circumscribed by the Norwegian lichenologist Johannes Musaeus Norman in 1853. He characterised it by small, oval spores with thin, smooth, hyaline walls, lacking oil in the central lumen; each end bears a tiny oil-bearing receptacle, the receptacles being joined by a slender funiculus that vanishes as the spores mature. The apothecia (fruiting bodies) are parmelioid or biatorine. Norman placed the "true Citrini" (yellow to orange forms) in Teloschistes, arguing that when defining genera one must give greater weight to the structure of the fruiting bodies than to the thallus: Teloschistes unites species with a fully developed fruticose thallus and others with a very reduced, almost crustose thallus. He noted that spores of different species (e.g., flavicantis, ferruginei, aurei) cannot be reliably distinguished, and that microscopic study of colour—reflecting the organism's chemical life—together with habitat, distribution, and intermediates, supports the close affinity of these Citrine forms within the genus. The genus name Teloschistes is derived from the Greek τέλειος (teleios, meaning 'complete' or 'perfect') and σχιστός (schistos, meaning 'split' or 'divided'), referring to the distinctly separated or divided nature of the thallus structure. The genus was originally named Borrera by Swedish lichenologist Erik Acharius, after the English botanist William Borrer, but this name was later formally rejected (nomen rejiciendum) to avoid confusion with the similarly spelled Borreria, a conserved name for a genus of flowering plants in the family Rubiaceae.

In 2013, Sergey Kondratyuk and colleagues proposed to resurrect Niorma, a genus originally established by Abramo Bartolommeo Massalongo in 1861, to accommodate the species complex centred around Teloschistes hypoglaucus. Under this proposal, several species would be transferred out of Teloschistes into the revived genus. However, this circumscription has not been universally accepted. Wilk and colleagues (2021) argued that Teloschistes forms a genetically diverse but strongly supported clade, and preferred to retain the broader genus concept of Arup et al. (2013) until more data become available.

== Description ==
Teloschistes species form small, shrubby lichens with many branches. The lobes are usually cylindrical (terete) but can be somewhat flattened with a clear upper and lower side (dorsiventral). They branch sparingly to profusely and often bear fine hair-like outgrowths (fibrils or cilia). Attachment is by a small basal holdfast or simply by the thallus gripping or tangling around the substrate; they lack rhizines (the root-like anchoring threads seen in many foliose lichens). The upper surface is characteristically bright yellow to orange—sometimes paler beneath—and in some non-British species can be grey-green to ash-grey. Powdery reproductive patches (soralia) may be present. In section, the outer skin (cortex) is made of fungal threads (hyphae) aligned parallel to the surface and glued together, the internal layer (medulla) consists of loosely interwoven hyphae aligned more or less vertically, and the photosynthetic partner is a green alga of the Trebouxia type (trebouxioid photobiont).

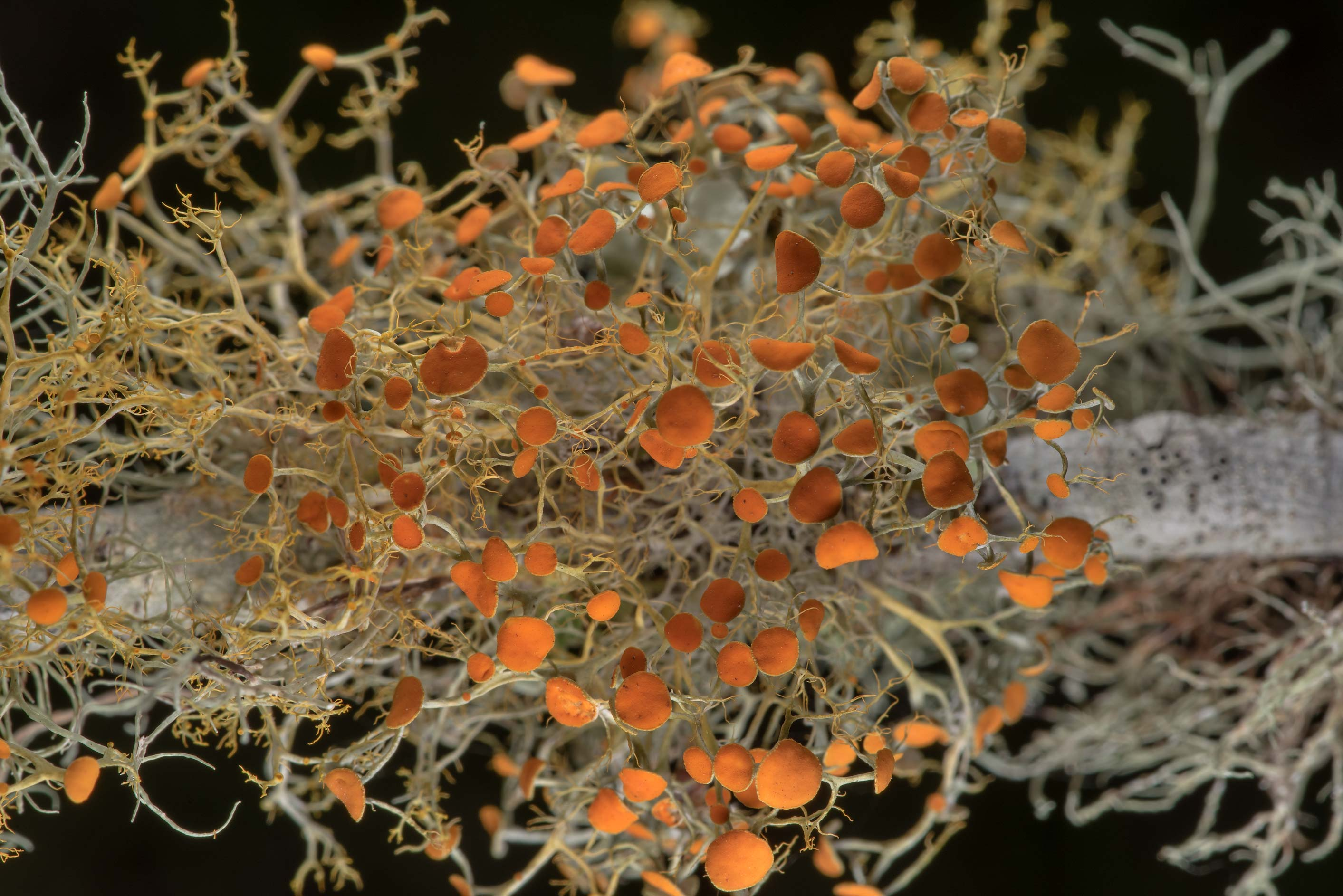
Teloschistes exilis

Sexual fruit bodies (apothecia) occur on the surface, at branch tips, or along the margins, and have a persistent rim made from thallus tissue (a thalline margin) that may itself be ciliate. The disc ranges from yellow to orange. The thin granular layer at the top (epithecium) is yellow and reacts purple-crimson with potassium hydroxide solutiomn (K+), while the spore-bearing layer (hymenium) and the tissue beneath it (hypothecium) are colourless. The apothecial matrix (hamathecium) contains simple, septate threads (paraphyses) with slightly enlarged tips. The spore sacs (asci) are elongate-club-shaped, contain eight spores, have a subtly thickened tip with a broad internal "beak" (rostrum), and show a blue reaction to the combined potassium/iodine test (K/I+) in the inner apex and an external cap; they are non-fissitunicate (they do not split open lengthwise when releasing spores). The spores are colourless, ellipsoidal, and polarilocular—divided by a narrow central septum into two lens-shaped chambers, one at each end. Asexual fruit bodies (pycnidia) are immersed, round, deep orange-red, and usually contain several chambers; they produce colourless, rod-shaped conidia without cross-walls. The chemistry is dominated by anthraquinone pigments—especially parietin, which gives the vivid yellow-orange colour—along with depsidones and some unidentified substances.

== Species ==
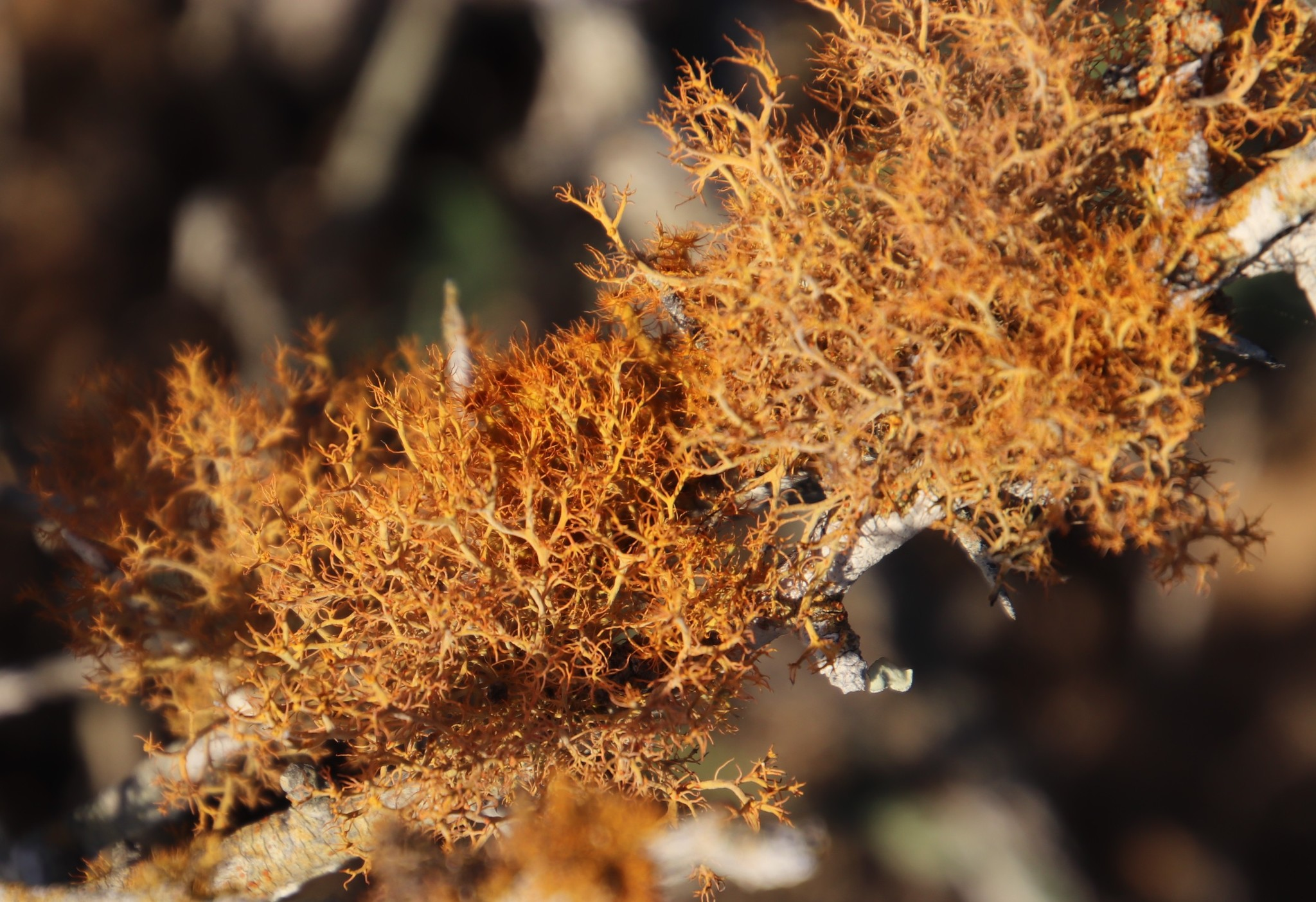
Teloschistes capensis

As of February 2026, Species Fungorum (in the Catalogue of Life) accepts 17 species of Teloschistes:

- Teloschistes biorettii Abbayes (1931)
- Teloschistes caespitosus (Müll.Arg.) Poelt (1962)
- Teloschistes capensis (L.f.) Müll.Arg. (1911)
- Teloschistes chrysophthalmus (L.) Th.Fr. (1861)
- Teloschistes cymbaliferus (G.Mey.) Müll.Arg. (1888)
- Teloschistes exilis (Michx.) Vain. (1890)
- Teloschistes fasciculatus Hillmann (1938)
- Teloschistes flavicans (Sw.) Norman (1852)
- Teloschistes inflatus Frödén (2007)
- Teloschistes perrugosus Müll.Arg. (1891)
- Teloschistes peruensis (Ach.) J.W.Thomson (1968)
- Teloschistes puber (Ach.) Almb. (1989)
- Teloschistes pulvinaris (Zahlbr.) Almb. (1989)
- Teloschistes sieberianus (Laurer) Hillmann (1930)
- Teloschistes spinosus Js.Murray (1960)
- Teloschistes stellatus (Meyen & Flot.) Müll.Arg. (1883)
- Teloschistes velifer F.Wilson (1889)
- Teloschistes xanthoroides Js.Murray (1960)
