= List of fungi of South Africa – T =

This is an alphabetical list of the fungal taxa as recorded from South Africa. Currently accepted names have been appended.

== Ta ==
Genus: Taphrina

- Taphrina aurea Sade.
- Taphrina deformans Tul.
- Taphrina mume Nish.
- Taphrina Pruni Tul.

Family: Taphrinaceae

Order: Taphrinales

== Te ==
Genus: Teleutospora

- Teleutospora ventosa Syd.

Genus: Telimena

- Telimena corticicola Doidge.
- Telimena viventis

Family: Teloschistaceae (Mostly lichens)

Genus: Teloschistes (Lichens)

- Teloschistes africanus Zahlbr.
- Teloschistes capensis Malme.
- Teloschistes capensis f. puber Malme.
- Teloschistes chrvsocarpoides Wain.
- Teloschistes chrysophthalmus Beltr.
- Teloschistes chrysophthalmus f. armatus Hillm.
- Teloschistes chrysophthalmus f. cinereus Müll.Arg.
- Teloschistes chrysophthalmus var. dilatatus Hillm.
- Teloschistes chrysophthalmus var. pulvinaris Zahlbr.
- Teloschistes controversus var. semigranularis Müll.Arg.
- Teloschistes costatus Hillm.
- Teloschistes derelictus Zahlbr.
- Teloschistes exilis Wain.
- Teloschistes exilis var. dealbatus Hillm.
- Teloschistes exilis var. pulvinatus Hillm.
- Teloschistes flavicans Norm .
- Teloschistes flavicans f. minor Cromb.
- Teloschistes flavicans var. costatus Steiner
- Teloschistes flavicans var. croceus Müll.Arg.
- Teloschistes flavicans var. dealbatus Zahlbr.
- Teloschistes flavicans var. exilis Müll.Arg.
- Teloschistes flavicans var. intermedius Müll.Arg.
- Teloschistes flavicans var. maximus Zahlbr.
- Teloschistes flavicans var. puber Hillm.
- Teloschistes flavicans var. puberus Müll. Arg.
- Teloschistes flavicans var. pulvinatus Zahlbr.
- Teloschistes flavicans var. validus Miill.Arg.
- Teloschistes hypoglaucus Zahlbr.
- Teloschistes perrugosus Müll.Arg.
- Teloschistes scorigenus Wain.
- Teloschistes validus Hillm.
- Teloschistes verrucosus Hillm.
- Teloschistes villosus Norm.

Genus: Teratosphaeria

- Teratosphaeria fibrillosa Syd.

Genus: Terfezia

- Terfezia boudieri Chat.
- Terfezia claveryi Chat.
- Terfezia pfeilii P.Henn.

Genus: Tetracium

- Tetracium rectisporum Petch.

Genus: Tetraploa

- Tetraploa aristata Berk. & Br.

== Th ==
Genus: Theissenula

- Theissenula woodiana Doidge

Genus: Thelephora Ehrh. ex Willd., (1787)

- Thelephora biennis Fr.
- Thelephora fulva Lev.
- Thelephora fuscoviolascens Mont. (1847)
- Thelephora hirsuta Willd.
- Thelephora intybacea Pers. ex Fr.
- Thelephora laciniata Pers, ex Fr.
- Thelephora palmata Fr.
- Thelephora pedicellata Schvr.
- Thelephora penicillata Lloyd.
- Thelephora pnlverulenta Lev.
- Thelephora punicea Alb. & Schw. ex Fr.
- Thelephora terrestris Ehrh. ex Fr.

Family: Thelephoraceae

Genus: Theleporus

- Theleporus cretaceus Fr.

Genus: Thelotrema (Lichens)

- Thelotrema capense Zahlbr.
- Thelotrema cavatum Ach.
- Thelotrema diplochistoidea Vain.
- Thelotrema henatomma Ach.
- Thelotrema leioplacoides Nyl.
- Thelotrema lepadinum Ach.
- Thelotrema microglaenoides Wain.
- Thelotrema muscigenum Stizenb.
- Thelotrema variolarioides Ach.

Family: Thelotremaceae

Genus: Thielavia

- Thielavia basicola Zopf.

Genus: Thielaviopsis

- Thielaviopsis basicola Ferraris.
- Thielaviopsis paradoxa (De Seynes) Höhn., (1904), accepted as Ceratocystis paradoxa (Dade) C. Moreau, (1952)

Genus: Thyrinula

- Thyrinula eucalyptina Petrak & Syd.

Genus: Thyriopsis

- Thyriopsis proteae v.d.Byl

Genus: Thyrococcum

- Thyrococcum humicola Buchanan

== Ti ==
Genus: Tilletia

- Tilletia ayresii Berk, ex Mass.
- Tilletia caries Tul.
- Tilletia echinosperma Ains.
- Tilletia foetans Trel.
- Tilletia heterospora Zundel.
- Tilletia laevis Kuhn.
- Tilletia transvaalensis Zundel.
- Tilletia tritici Wint.
- Tilletia verrucosa Cooke & Mass.
- Tilletia viennotii Syd.

Family:Tilletiaceae

Genus: Tilmadoche

- Tilmadoche mutabilis Rost.
- Tilmadoche nutans Rost.
- Tilmadoche viridis

Genus: Tilotus

- Tilotus lenzitiformis Kalchbr.

Genus: Titaea

- Titaea doidgeae Hansf.

Genus: Titanella

- Titanella grandis Syd.

== To ==
Genus: Togninia

- Togninia quaternarioides Berl.

Genus: Tolyposporium

- Tolyposporium chloridis P.Henn.
- Tolyposporium penicillariae Bref. accepted as Moesziomyces bullatus (J. Schröt.) Vánky, (1977)
- Tolyposporium tristachydis Zundel.

Genus: Tomasellia

- Tomasellia africana Zahlbr.

Genus: Toninia (Lichens)

- Toninia bumamma Zahlbr.
- Toninia caerulonigricans Th.Fr.
- Toninia caesiopallida Zahlbr.
- Toninia flava Zahlbr.
- Toninia incretata Zahlbr.
- Toninia verrucosa Flagey.

Genus: Tornabenia

- Tornabenia africana Massal.
- Tornabenia capensis Massal.
- Tornabenia flavicans Massal.

Genus: Torula Pers., (1795)

- Torula fusidium Thuem.
- Torula glutinis Pringsh. & Bilewsky.
- Torula herbarum Link.
- Torula histolyca Stoddard & Cutler.
- Torula sacchari Corda.

Genus: Torulopsis

- Torulopsis glutinis Doidge.
- Torulopsis mucilaginosa Ciferri & Redaelli.
- Torulopsis utilis (Henneberg) Lodder, (1934), accepted as Cyberlindnera jadinii (Sartory, R. Sartory, J. Weill & J. Mey.) Minter (2009)

== Tr ==
Genus: Trabutia

- Trabutia evansii Theiss. & Syd.
- Trabutia ficuum Theiss. & Syd.
- Trabutia nervisequens Theiss. & Syd.

Genus: Trametes

- Trametes albotexta Lloyd
- Trametes ambigua Fr.
- Trametes aratoides Pat. & Har.
- Trametes balanina Fr.
- Trametes capensis Lloyd.
- Trametes captiosa Mont. accepted as Coriolopsis floccosa (Bull.) Murrill, (1903)
- Trametes cervina Bres.
- Trametes cingulata Berk.
- Trametes circinatus Fr.
- Trametes corrugata Bres.
- Trametes detonsa Fr.
- Trametes devexa
- Trametes dregeana
- Trametes fibrosa Fr.
- Trametes funalis Fr.
- Trametes gibbosa Fr.
- Trametes glabrescens Fr.
- Trametes griseo-lilacina v.d.Byl.
- Trametes heteromorpha Lloyd.
- Trametes hispida Bagl.
- Trametes hydnoides (Sw.) Fr., (1838), accepted as Hexagonia hydnoides (Sw.) M.Fidalgo
- Trametes hystrix Cooke.
- Trametes incerta Curr.
- Trametes incondita Fr.
- Trametes isidioides Fr.
- Trametes keetii v.d.Byl.
- Trametes lactea (Fr.) Pilát (1940), accepted as Irpex lacteus (Fr.) Fr. (1828)
- Trametes lactinea Fr.
- Trametes lanata Fr.
- Trametes meyenii Lloyd.
- Trametes moesta Kalchbr.
- Trametes natalensis Fr.
- Trametes obstinatus Cooke.
- Trametes ochraceus Lloyd.
- Trametes ochrolignea Llovd.
- Trametes persoonii Pat.
- Trametes pertusa Fr.
- Trametes pictus
- Trametes proteus Fr.
- Trametes rigida Berk. & Mont. accepted as Coriolopsis floccosa (Bull.) Murrill, (1903)
- Trametes robiniophila Murr.
- Trametes roseola Pat. & Har.
- Trametes salebrosa v.d.Byl.
- Trametes scalaris Fr.
- Trametes sceleton Fr.
- Trametes scleroderma Fr.
- Trametes sepium Berk.
- Trametes serialis Fr.
- Trametes serpens Fr.
- Trametes suaveolens Fr.
- Trametes subflava Lloyd.
- Trametes sycomori P.Henn.
- Trametes tomentosa v.d.Byl.
- Trametes torrida Fr.
- Trametes trabea (Pers.) Bres. (1897), accepted as Gloeophyllum trabeum (Pers.) Murrill (1908)
- Trametes umbrina Fr.
- Trametes ursina (Link) Fr., (1849), accepted as Hexagonia hydnoides (Sw.) M.Fidalgo
- Trametes varians v.d.Byl.
- Trametes violacea Lloyd.
- Trametes wahlbergii Fr.
- Trametes zimmermannii Bres.

Genus: Tranzschelia

- Tranzschelia punctata Arth.

Genus: Tremella

- Tremella alba Kalchbr.
- Tremella corrugis Fr.
- Tremella crassa Lloyd.
- Tremella epigaea Berk. & Br.
- Tremella frondosa Fr.
- Tremella fuciformis Berk.
- Tremella hemifoliacea Lloyd.
- Tremella lutescens Pers. ex Fr.
- Tremella mesenterica Retz. ex Fr.
- Tremella micropera Kalchbr. & Cooke.
- Tremella microspora Lloyd.
- Tremella moriformis Berk.

Family: Tremellaceae

Family: Tremellineae

Genus: Treubiomyces

- Treubiomyces celastri Doidge

Genus: Trichamphora

- Trichamphora pezizoides Jungh.

Genus: Trichasterina

- Trichasterina popowiae Doidge

Genus: Trichobasis

- Trichobasis cichoracearum Lev. accepted as Coleosporium tussilaginis (Pers.) Lév. (1849)
- Trichobasis hypoestis Cooke
- Trichobasis labmtarum Lev.
- Trichobasis rubigo-vera (DC.) Lév. (1849), accepted as Puccinia recondita Dietel & Holw. (1857)
- Trichobasis vernoniae Cooke.
- Trichobasis zehneriae Thuem.

Genus: Trichoderma

- Trichoderma lignorum (Tode) Harz, (1871), accepted as Trichoderma viride Pers., (1794)
- Trichoderma viride Pers. (1794),

Genus: Trichodochium

- Trichodochium disseminatum Syd.

Genus: Trichoglossum

- Trichoglossum hirsutum Boud.

Genus: Tricholoma

- Tricholoma album Quel.
- Tricholoma amarum Rea.
- Tricholoma caffrorum Sacc.
- Tricholoma caffrorum var. sulonense Sacc.
- Tricholoma cerinum Quel.
- Tricholoma gambosum Gill.
- Tricholoma gambosum var. capense Kalchbr. & MacOwan.
- Tricholoma georgii Quel.
- Tricholoma melaleucum Quel.
- Tricholoma melaleucum var. adstringens Quel.
- Tricholoma melaleucum var. prophyroleucum Gill.
- Tricholoma nudum Quel. (sic) possibly (Bull.) P.Kumm. (1871), accepted as Clitocybe nuda (Bull.) H.E.Bigelow & A.H.Sm. (1969)
- Tricholoma personatum Quel.
- Tricholoma russula Gill.
- Tricholoma saponaceum Quel.
- Tricholoma ustale Quel.

Genus: Trichopeltaceae Trichopeltaceae

Genus: Trichopeltula

- Trichopeltula carissae Doidge
- Trichopeltula kentaniensis Doidge

Genus: Trichophyton

- Trichophyton mentagrophytes Gedoelst.
- Trichophyton purpureum Bang.
- Trichophyton roseum Sabouraud.
- Trichophyton sulfureum Sabouraud.
- Trichophyton violaceum Sabouraud.

Family: Trichophytoneae

Genus: Trichospaeria

- Trichospaeria vandae Verw. & du Pless.

Genus: Trichosporium

- Trichosporium purpureum Mass.

Genus: Trichothecium

- Trichothecium roseum Link.

Fanily: Trichothyriaceae

Genus: Trichothyrium

- Trichothyrium dubiosum Theis.
- Trichothyrium elegans Doidge
- Trichothyrium robustum Doidge

Genus: Trichotrema

- Trichotrema trichosporum Clements

Genus: Tripospora

- Tripospora cookei Sacc.
- Tripospora tripos Lindau.

Genus: Triposporium

- Triposporium stapeliae du Pless.

Genus: Trochodium

- Trochodium ipomoeae Syd.

Genus: Tryblidaria

- Tryblidaria breutelii Rehm .
- Tryblidaria capensis Vouaux.

Genus: Tryblidiella

- Tryblidiella rufula (Spreng.) Sacc. (1883), accepted as Rhytidhysteron rufulum (Spreng.) Speg. (1920)

Genus: Tryblidium

- Tryblidium rufulum Spreng.

Family: Trypetheliaceae (Mostly lichens)

Genus: Trypethelium (Lichens)

- Trypethelium austroafricanum Zahlbr.
- Trypethelium bicolor Taylor.
- Trypethelium eluteriae Spreng.
- Trypethelium phlyctaena Fee.
- Trypethelium sprengelii Ach.
- Trypethelium verrucosum Fee.

== Tu ==
Family: Tuberaceae

Order: Tuberales

Genus: Tubercularia

- Tubercularia fici Edgert.
- Tubercularia minor Link.
- Tubercularia persicina Ditm.
- Tubercularia vulgaris Tode. accepted as Nectria cinnabarina (Tode) Fr. (1849)

Family: Tuberculariaceae

Genus: Tuberculina

- Tuberculina malvacearum Speg.
- Tuberculina persicina Sacc.

Family: Tubulinaceae

Genus: Tubercinia

- Tubercinia eriospermi Syd.
- Tubercinia ornithoglossi Syd.

Genus: Tulostoma

- Tulostoma adherens Lloyd.
- Tulostoma albicans White.
- Tulostoma album Mass.
- Tulostoma angolense Welw. & Curr.
- Tulostoma australianum Lloyd.
- Tulostoma bonianum Pat.
- Tulostoma brumale Pers.
- Tulostoma cyclophorum Lloyd.
- Tulostoma lacticeps Bres.
- Tulostoma lesliei v.d.Byl.
- Tulostoma macowani Bres.
- Tulostoma mammosum Fr.
- Tulostoma mammosum var. squamosum Fr.
- Tulostoma obesum Cooke & Ellis.
- Tulostoma poculatum White.
- Tulostoma purpusii P.Henn.
- Tulostoma squamosum Pers.
- Tulostoma transvaalii Lloyd

Family: Tulostomataceae E.Fisch. (1900), accepted as Agaricaceae Chevall. (1826)

== Ty ==
Genus: Tylophoron

- Tylophoron africanum Vain.
- Tylophoron bylii Merrill

Genus: Tympanopsis

- Tympanopsis euomphala Starb.

== See also ==
- List of bacteria of South Africa
- List of Oomycetes of South Africa
- List of slime moulds of South Africa
- List of fungi of South Africa
  - List of fungi of South Africa – A
  - List of fungi of South Africa – B
  - List of fungi of South Africa – C
  - List of fungi of South Africa – D
  - List of fungi of South Africa – E
  - List of fungi of South Africa – F
  - List of fungi of South Africa – G
  - List of fungi of South Africa – H
  - List of fungi of South Africa – I
  - List of fungi of South Africa – J
  - List of fungi of South Africa – K
  - List of fungi of South Africa – L
  - List of fungi of South Africa – M
  - List of fungi of South Africa – N
  - List of fungi of South Africa – O
  - List of fungi of South Africa – P
  - List of fungi of South Africa – Q
  - List of fungi of South Africa – R
  - List of fungi of South Africa – S
  - List of fungi of South Africa – T
  - List of fungi of South Africa – U
  - List of fungi of South Africa – V
  - List of fungi of South Africa – W
  - List of fungi of South Africa – X
  - List of fungi of South Africa – Y
  - List of fungi of South Africa – Z
