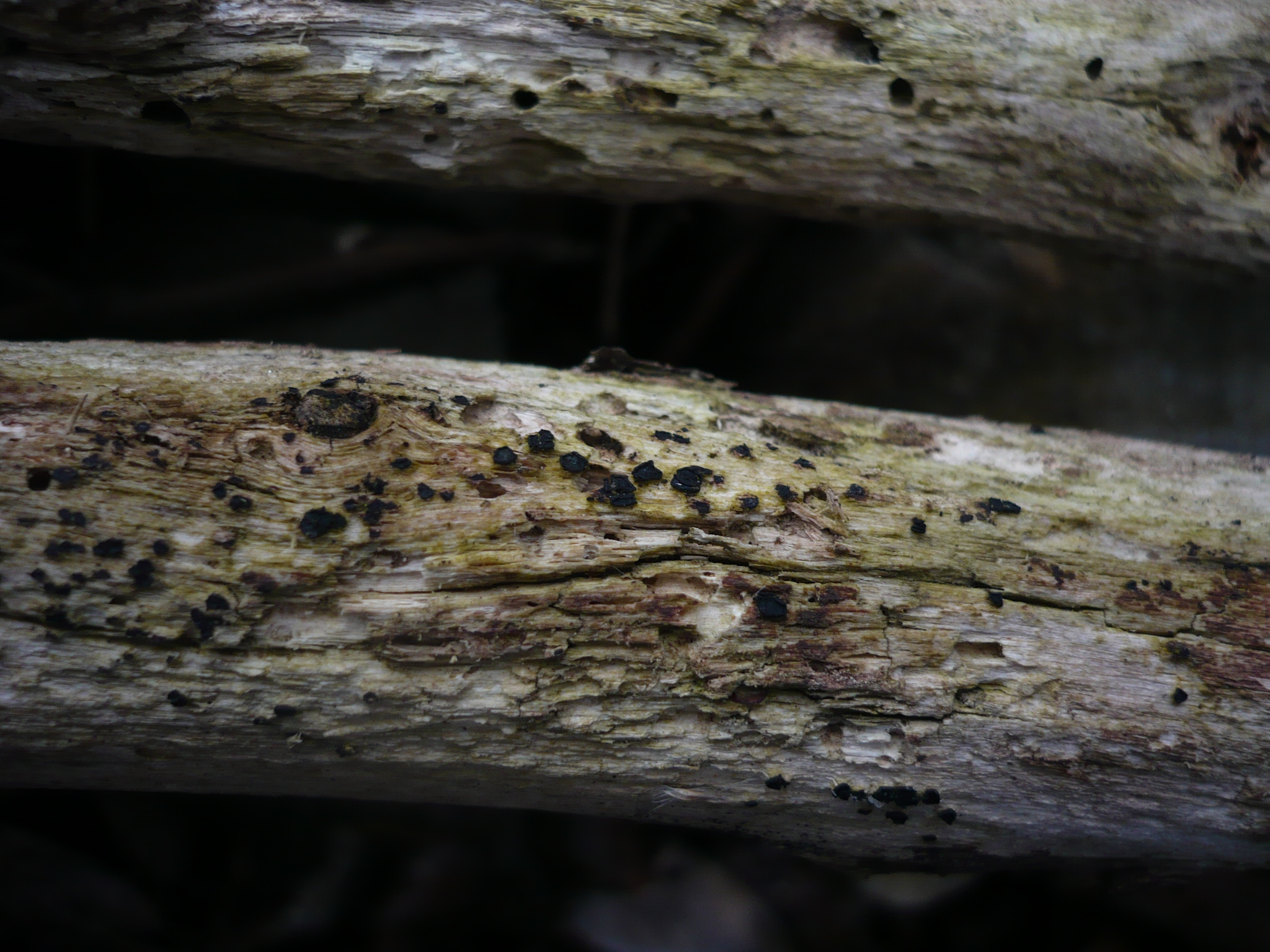
- Patellaria atrata

Scientific classification
- Kingdom: Fungi
- Division: Ascomycota
- Class: Dothideomycetes
- Order: Patellariales
- Family: Patellariaceae; Corda (1838)

Type genus
- Patellaria Fr. (1822)

= Patellariales =

Family of fungi

The Patellariaceae are a family of sac fungi. It is the only representative of the order Patellariales. According to a 2008 estimate, the family contains 15 genera and 38 species.

== Genera ==
- Baggea
- Banhegyia
- Brunaudia
- Endotryblidium
- Eutryblidiella
- Holmiella
- Lahmiomyces
- Lecanidiella
- Lecanidion
- Lirellodisca
- Murangium
- Patellaria
- Poetschia
- Rhizodiscina
- Rhytidhysteron
- Schrakia
- Stratisporella
- Tryblidaria
- Tryblidiella
