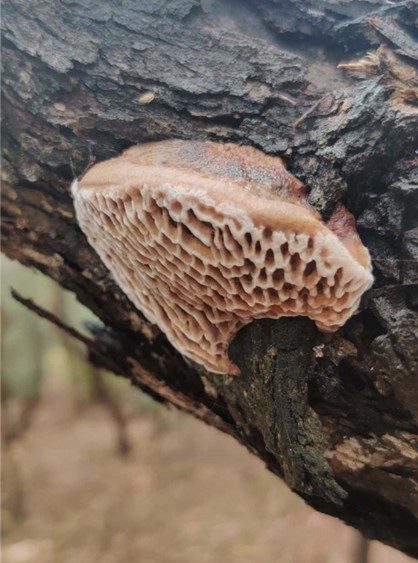

Scientific classification
- Kingdom: Fungi
- Division: Basidiomycota
- Class: Agaricomycetes
- Order: Polyporales
- Family: Polyporaceae
- Genus: Hexagonia
- Species: H. vesparia

Binomial name
- Hexagonia vesparia (Berk.) Ryvarden, 1972
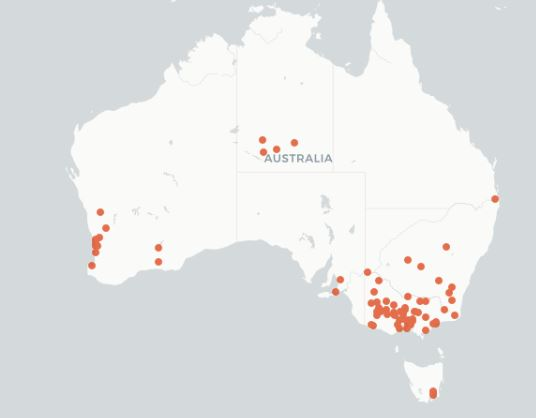
- Distribution of Hexagonia vesparia in Australia

Synonyms
- Hexagonia gunnii Berk.; Hexagonia gunnii var. corticosa (Berk.) Sacc.; Hexagonia gunnii var. gunnii Fr.; Polyporus vesparius Berk.; Polyporus vesparius var. corticosus Berk.; Polyporus vesparius var. vesparius Berk.

= Hexagonia vesparia =

Species of fungus

Hexagonia vesparia, sometimes known as the wasp nest polypore, is a bracket fungus in the Polyporaceae family occurring mainly in tropical and coastal regions in Australia, but it has also been recorded in semi arid regions of Australia. The genus name came from the Latin word hexagonus meaning with six angles.

== Description ==
Wasp nest polypore is an irregular hoof shaped bracket fungus approximately 25–80mm in diameter. With its hexagonal and radially elongated pores it gives the fungus the appearance of a wasp nest. The flesh has a hard woody texture that extends about five centimetres from the substrate with pores that change in colour from off white to dark brown depending on age. The spores are smooth and cylindrical 14–17 × 5–7 micrometres. The upper surface attached to the substrate can be hairy and has bumps and groves that look like channels

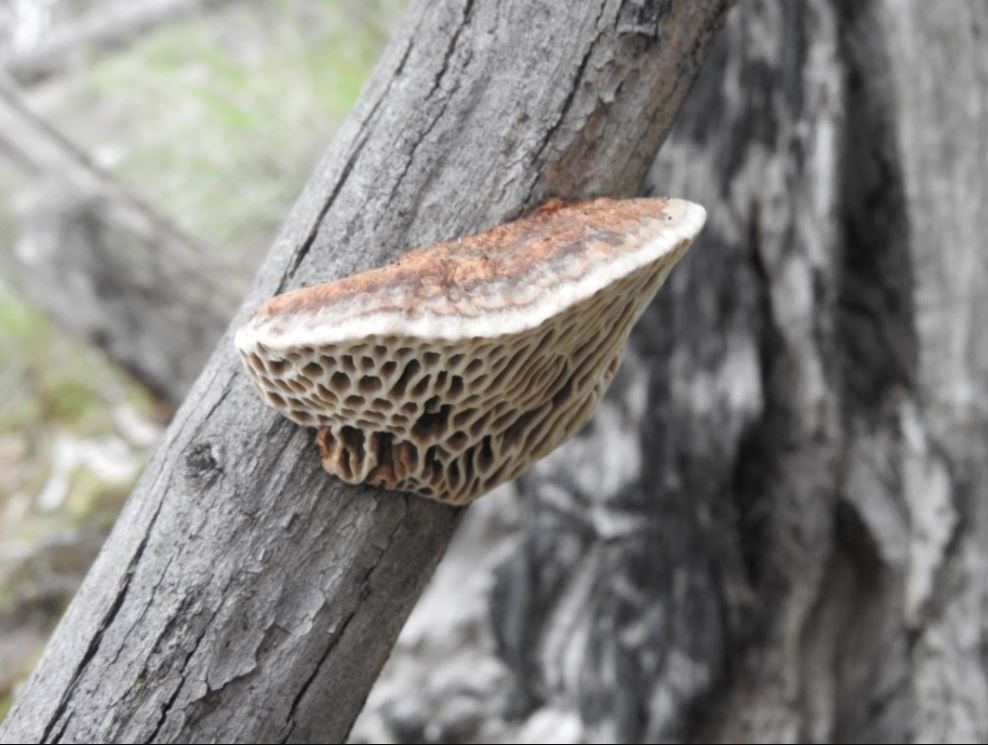
Wasp Nest Polypore on substrate

== Distribution ==
Hexagonia vesparia has it greatest known distribution in Victoria, NSW and Perth, and sparingly in the Northern Territory, South Australia and Queensland. Fungal surveys have been limited in Australia with the focus on fauna and flora, however fungi are starting to be included, and recordings of Hexagonia vesparia and other fungi species are likely to expand distribution areas.

== Habitat and ecology ==
Wasp nest polypore are found on both branches and trunks of living trees and dead logs in rainforest and wet sclerophyll forest, however they have been recorded in more semi arid areas of Eucalypt Mallee Woodland. Fungi are categorised into groups dependant on their shape, form, texture and function, known as morphogroups. Wasp nest polypore are categorised as fungi with pores and are saprophytic fungi, which is the largest macro fungi group.

Saprophytic fungi are the recyclers of an ecosystem and breakdown organic material by releasing an enzyme which absorbs lignin, cellulose or chitin from the material and turns it into a soluble compound for itself and that of other plants in the way of nutrients. They play a vital role in cleaning up dead material in forests and recycling nutrients such as carbon and nitrogen.

== Reproduction ==
What is most visible of the bracket fungi is the reproductive fruiting bodies (basidiocarp) or the spore-bearing structure which extends out of the substrate. On the underside of the bracket are spore-producing tubes (basidium). Basidiomycota reproduce sexually and for germination to occur on the substrate, haploid spores of two different mating strains fuse (karyogamy), to produce dikaryotic a diploid zygote. The haploid basidiospores are dispersed through the air to other trees or by water drops, dropped onto dead logs. Thin elongated structures called (hyphae) form a network within the wood on which bracket fungi grow, these collective hyphae create the mycelium that extends into the wood, and colonises the host substrate.

== Conservation ==
Hexagonia as a genus has no significant conservation concerns in Queensland and is not threatened in Western Australia. Other states in Australia have not listed any conservation status, however disturbances such as too frequent fire regimes and land clearing could cause a decline in this species because of the loss of their host. Further research is required to better understand the fire response of this species, however retaining dead wood - trees, logs and other organic matter in ecosystems promote diverse fungi species creating a resilient ecosystem.
