= Pseudotremella =

Scientific classification
- Kingdom: Fungi
- Division: Basidiomycota
- Class: Tremellomycetes
- Order: Tremellales
- Family: Bulleraceae
- Genus: Pseudotremella; Xin Zhan Liu, F.Y. Bai, M. Groenew. & Boekhout (2015)

Type species
- Pseudotremella moriformis (Sm. & Sowerby) Xin Zhan Liu, F.Y. Bai, M. Groenew. & Boekhout

Genus of fungi

Pseudotremella is a genus of fungi in the family Bulleraceae. All Pseudotremella species are parasites of other fungi and produce anamorphic yeast states. Basidiocarps (fruit bodies), when produced, are gelatinous and are colloquially classed among the "jelly fungi". Four species of Pseudotremella are currently recognized worldwide. Two of these species are, as yet, only known from their yeast states.

== Taxonomy ==
=== History ===
Molecular research, based on cladistic analysis of DNA sequences, has shown that Tremella is polyphyletic (and hence artificial). In 2017 the new genus Pseudotremella was proposed to accommodate a group of species that resemble Tremella species morphologically, but are only distantly related to the latter genus.

== Description ==
Fruit bodies (when present) are gelatinous, white to amber or dark purple, and pustular to cephaliform (like a brain, with folds and ridges).

=== Microscopic characters ===
Pseudotremella species produce hyphae that are typically clamped and have haustorial cells from which hyphal filaments seek out and penetrate the hyphae of the host. The basidia are "tremelloid" (globose to ellipsoid, sometimes stalked, and vertically or diagonally septate), giving rise to long, sinuous sterigmata or epibasidia on which the basidiospores are produced. These spores are smooth, globose to ellipsoid, and germinate by hyphal tube or by yeast cells. Conidiophores are often present, producing conidiospores that are similar to yeast cells.

== Habitat and distribution ==
Species are parasitic on wood-rotting fungi in the phyla Ascomycota, specifically those that occur on dead attached or fallen branches.

As a group, Pseudotremella species occur worldwide, though individual species may have a more restricted distribution.

== Species and hosts ==
Image	Name	Distribution	Host
	Pseudotremella allantoinivorans	Netherlands	unknown
	Pseudotremella lacticolor	Japan	unknown
	Pseudotremella moriformis	Europe, North America	Diaporthe spp
	Pseudotremella nivalis	Taiwan	Diatrype spp
