= Bullera =

Scientific classification
- Kingdom: Fungi
- Division: Basidiomycota
- Class: Tremellomycetes
- Order: Tremellales
- Family: Bulleraceae
- Genus: Bullera; Derx (1930)

Type species
- Bullera alba (W.F. Hanna) Derx

Synonyms
- Bulleromyces Boekhout & Á. Fonseca (1991)

Genus of fungi

Bullera is a genus of fungi in the family Bulleraceae. The genus, which comprises both anamorphic and teleomorphic forms, formerly contained some 35 species. Molecular research, based on cladistic analysis of DNA sequences, has however assigned most of these species elsewhere and reduced the genus Bullera to just four species. Anamorphic forms are yeasts; teleomorphic forms (formerly referred to Bulleromyces) produce septate basidia resembling those of Tremella species, but are not known to produce basidiocarps (fruit bodies).

The genus name Bullera, is in honour of Arthur Henry Reginald Buller (1874–1944), a British-Canadian mycologist.
