= Rhytidhysteron rufulum =

Scientific classification
- Kingdom: Fungi
- Division: Ascomycota
- Class: Dothideomycetes
- Order: Patellariales
- Family: Patellariaceae
- Genus: Rhytidhysteron
- Species: R. rufulum

Binomial name
- Rhytidhysteron rufulum (Spreng.) Speg. (1920)

Synonyms
- Hysterium rufulum Spreng. (1820); Triblidium rufulum (Spreng.) Ellis & Everh. Tryblidiella rufula (Spreng.) Sacc. (1883)

Species of fungus

Rhytidhysteron rufulum is a saprobic ascomycete able to infect humans.
