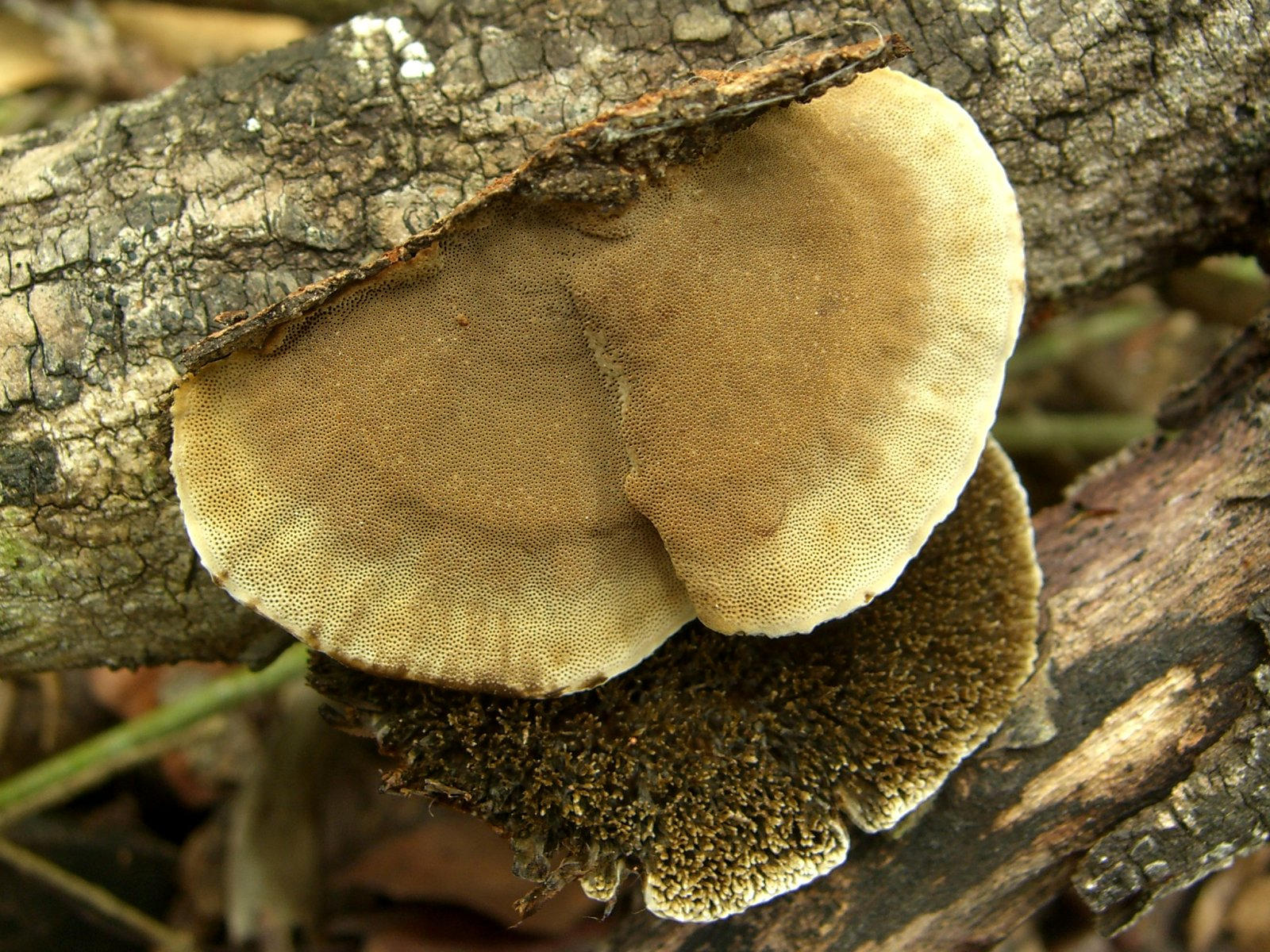
- Hexagonia hydnoides

Scientific classification
- Kingdom: Fungi
- Division: Basidiomycota
- Class: Agaricomycetes
- Order: Polyporales
- Family: Polyporaceae
- Genus: Hexagonia; Fr. (1838)

Type species
- Favolus hirtus (P.Beauv.) Fr. (1838)

Synonyms
- Apoxona Donk (1969); Pherima Raf. (1819); Phorima Raf. (1830); Pogonomyces Murrill (1904); Polyporus trib. Scenidium Klotzsch (1832); Scenidium (Klotzsch) Kuntze (1898)

= Hexagonia (fungus) =

Genus of fungi

Hexagonia is a genus of poroid fungi in the family Polyporaceae. The genus has a widespread distribution, especially in tropical regions. The generic name is derived from the Latin word hexagonus, meaning "with six angles".

== Species ==
As of October 2016, Index Fungorum accepts 41 species in Hexagonia:

- Hexagonia amplexens Pat. (1902)
- Hexagonia angulata Lloyd (1920)
- Hexagonia annamitica Pat. (1927)
- Hexagonia applanata (Bres.) Lloyd (1920)
- Hexagonia assaortina Sacc. & Bacc. (1917)
- Hexagonia bartlettii Massee (1908)
- Hexagonia bicolor McAlpine (1904)
- Hexagonia bivalvis (Pers.) Bres. (1913)
- Hexagonia burchellii Lloyd (1910)
- Hexagonia caliginosa Lloyd (1922)
- Hexagonia caperata (Pat.) Murrill (1904)
- Hexagonia casuarinae Pat. (1901)
- Hexagonia cucullata (Mont.) Murrill (1904) – Cameroon
- Hexagonia culmicola Niemelä & Kotir. (2015)
- Hexagonia cuprea Bres. (1911)
- Hexagonia dermatiphora Lloyd (1911)
- Hexagonia fioriana Sacc. (1910)
- Hexagonia fuscoglabra Lloyd (1922)
- Hexagonia heteropora (Mont.) Imazeki (1943)
- Hexagonia hydnoides (Sw.) M. Fidalgo (1968)
- Hexagonia leprosa Fr. (1851) – Pernambuco
- Hexagonia mirabilis Lloyd (1910)
- Hexagonia olivacea Lloyd (1914)
- Hexagonia phaeopora Pat. (1907)
- Hexagonia pobeguinii Har. (1892) – Africa
- Hexagonia purpurascens (Berk. & M.A. Curtis) Murrill (1904)
- Hexagonia retropicta (Bres.) Lloyd (1922)
- Hexagonia reyesii Pat. (1914)
- Hexagonia rhodopora Pat. (1912)
- Hexagonia seuratii Pat. (1906)
- Hexagonia similis Berk. (1846) – New South Wales
- Hexagonia tenuiformis Murrill (1912)
- Hexagonia tenuis (Hook.) Fr. (1838) – Africa; Asia; South America
- Hexagonia umbrinella Fr. (1845)
- Hexagonia umbrosa Lloyd (1920)
- Hexagonia velutina Pat. & Har. (1893)
- Hexagonia vesparia (Berk.) Ryvarden (1972) – Australia
- Hexagonia warburgiana (Henn.) Teixeira (1992)
- Hexagonia wightii (Klotzsch) Fr. (1838)
- Hexagonia zambeziana Torrend (1914)
