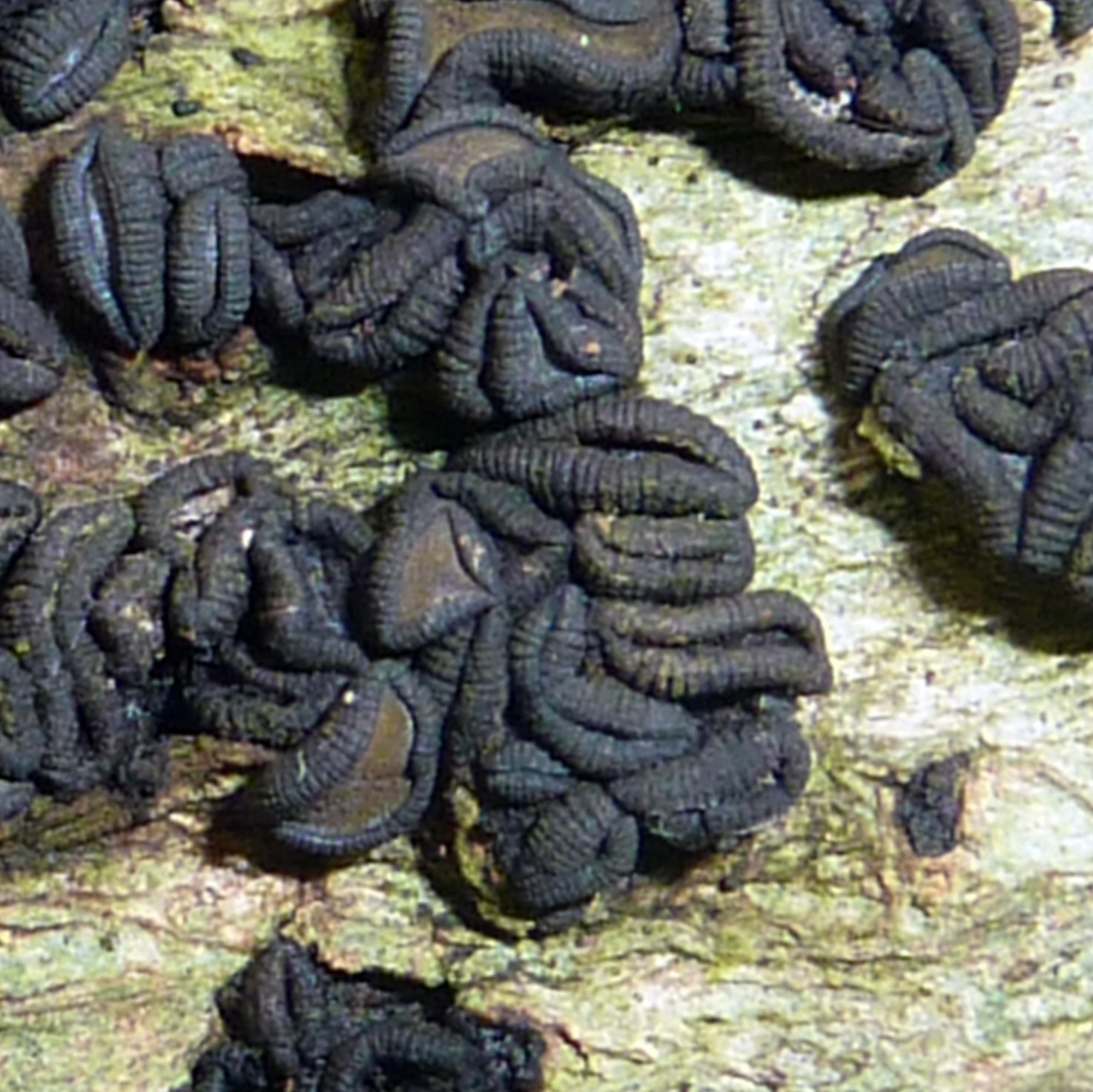
- unknown species of Rhytidhysteron in Panama

Scientific classification
- Domain: Eukaryota
- Kingdom: Fungi
- Division: Ascomycota
- Class: Dothideomycetes
- Order: Patellariales
- Family: Patellariaceae
- Genus: Rhytidhysteron; Speg. (1881)

Type species
- Rhytidhysteron brasiliense Speg. (1881)

Synonyms
- Rhytidhysterium Sacc. (1883); Tryblidiella Sacc. (1883); Rhytidopeziza Speg. (1885); Brunaudia (Sacc.) Kuntze (1898); Tryblidiella sect. Eutryblidiella Rehm (1904); Eutryblidiella (Rehm) Höhn. (1959)

= Rhytidhysteron =

Genus of fungi

Rhytidhysteron is a genus of fungi in the family Patellariaceae. It has 21 species.

== Species ==
- Rhytidhysteron beccarianum (Ces.) Bat. & Valle (1964)
- Rhytidhysteron brasiliense Speg. (1881)
- Rhytidhysteron bruguierae Dayarathne (2020)
- Rhytidhysteron camporesii Ekanayaka & K.D.Hyde (2020)
- Rhytidhysteron chromolaenae Mapook & K.D.Hyde (2020)
- Rhytidhysteron columbiense Soto-Medina & Lücking (2017)
- Rhytidhysteron discolor (Speg.) Speg. (1918)
- Rhytidhysteron dissimile (P.Karst.) Magnes (1997)
- Rhytidhysteron erioi Ekanayaka & K.D.Hyde (2020)
- Rhytidhysteron guaraniticum Speg. (1888)
- Rhytidhysteron hysterinum (Dufour) Samuels & E.Müll. (1980)
- Rhytidhysteron indicum (Anahosur) M.P.Sharma & K.S.Thind (1986)
- Rhytidhysteron mangrovei Vinit & K.D.Hyde (2019)
- Rhytidhysteron neohysterinum Cobos-Villagran, Hern.-Rodr., R.Valenz. & Raymundo (2020)
- Rhytidhysteron neorufulum Thambug. & K.D.Hyde (2016)
- Rhytidhysteron opuntiae (J.G.Br.) M.E.Barr (1990)
- Rhytidhysteron prosopidis Peck (1894)
- Rhytidhysteron quercinum (B.G.Desai & V.N.Pathak) M.P.Sharma & Rawla (1986)
- Rhytidhysteron rufulum (Spreng.) Speg. (1921)
- Rhytidhysteron scortechinii Sacc. & Berl. (1885)
- Rhytidhysteron tectonae Doilom & K.D.Hyde (2016)
- Rhytidhysteron thailandicum Thambug. & K.D.Hyde (2016)
- Rhytidhysteron viride Speg. (1881)
