= Pseudotremella moriformis =

Scientific classification
- Kingdom: Fungi
- Division: Basidiomycota
- Class: Tremellomycetes
- Order: Tremellales
- Family: Bulleraceae
- Genus: Pseudotremella
- Species: P. moriformis

Binomial name
- Pseudotremella moriformis (Sm. & Sowerby) Xin Zhan Liu, F.Y. Bai, M. Groenew. & Boekhout (2015)

Synonyms
- Tremella moriformis Sm. & Sowerby (1812); Dacrymyces moriformis (Sm. & Sowerby) Fr. (1822); Tremella colorata Peck (1873); Tremella atroglobosa Lloyd (1922)

Species of fungus

Pseudotremella moriformis is a species of fungus in the family Bulleraceae. It produces dark purple, pustular, gelatinous basidiocarps (fruit bodies) and is parasitic on pyrenomycetous fungi (Diaporthe species) on dead herbaceous stems and wood. It was originally described from England.

== Taxonomy and etymology ==
As Tremella moriformis, the species was originally described from Surrey in 1812 by English naturalists James Edward Smith and James Sowerby. It remained in Tremella until 2015 when molecular research, based on cladistic analysis of DNA sequences, showed that it was only distantly related to this genus and belonged instead to the newly proposed Pseudotremella in the family Bulleraceae.

Tremella atroglobosa, described from Brazil, and T. colorata, described from the US, are widely considered synonyms of T. moriformis.

The Latin epithet "moriformis" means "mulberry-shaped", with reference to both the shape and colour of typical fruit bodies.

== Description ==
Fruit bodies are gelatinous, dark purple-black, pustular, up to 0.5 cm across, but sometimes becoming larger (up to 1.5 cm across) and cerebriform (brain-like) through confluence. They emerge from the perithecia of their host. Microscopically, the basidia are tremelloid (globose to ellipsoid, with vertical or oblique septa), 2 to 4-celled, 15 to 22 by 14 to 20 μm. The basidiospores are subglobose, smooth, 8 to 9 by 8.5 to 10 μm.

== Similar species ==
Several species, such as Tremella globispora and Tremella exigua, produce similarly shaped, gelatinous fruit bodies on pyrenomycetous hosts, but are differently coloured, ranging from hyaline and white to brown or greenish black.

== Habitat and distribution ==
Pseudotremella moriformis is a parasite on Diaporthe species and possibly other ascomycetous hosts. It is found on dead, attached or fallen wood of deciduous trees.

The species was described from England and has been reported elsewhere in the United Kingdom and from continental Europe in Belgium, France, Germany, Italy, Poland, Portugal, and Spain. Outside Europe, the species has also been reported from Canada, the US, and Brazil.
