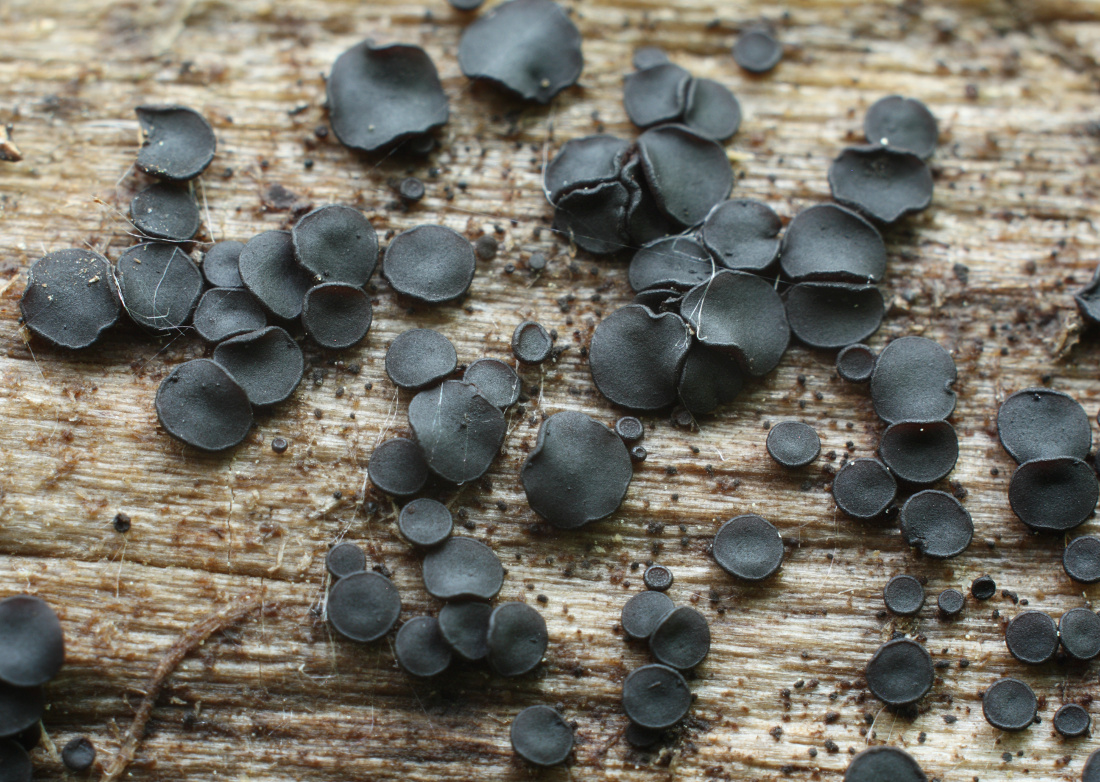
- Patellaria atrata

Scientific classification
- Domain: Eukaryota
- Kingdom: Fungi
- Division: Ascomycota
- Class: Dothideomycetes
- Order: Patellariales
- Family: Patellariaceae
- Genus: Patellaria; Fr. (1822)

Type species
- Patellaria atrata (Hedw.) Fr. (1822)

Synonyms
- Lecanidion Endl. (1830); Ucographa A.Massal. (1860)

= Patellaria =

Genus of fungi

Patellaria is a genus of fungi in the family Patellariaceae. The genus was circumscribed in 1822 by mycologist Elias Magnus Fries with Patellaria atrata assigned as the type species.

== Species ==
As of November 2021, Species Fungorum accepts 46 species of Patellaria.

- Patellaria abbotiana (Sowerby) Sacc. (1889)
- Patellaria aberrans Velen. (1934)
- Patellaria albiziae (A.Pande) A.Pande (2008)
- Patellaria americana (Fée) Müll.Arg. (1887)
- Patellaria apiculatae Dayarathne & K.D.Hyde (2020)
- Patellaria argyrioides Rehm (1900)
- Patellaria atrata (Hedw.) Fr. (Hedw.) Fr. (1822)
- Patellaria atratula (P.Karst.) P.Karst. (1885)
- Patellaria atroalba Cooke (1871)
- Patellaria bacillifera P.Karst. (1889)
- Patellaria berberidis Velen. (1934)
- Patellaria caesalpiniae Anahosur (1970)
- Patellaria californica Rehm (1911)
- Patellaria callispora Penz. & Sacc. (1902)
- Patellaria chromolaenae Mapook & K.D.Hyde (2020) – Thailand
- Patellaria combreti Tilak & Srinivas. Tilak & Srinivas. (1971)
- Patellaria compressa (Pers.) J.Kickx f. (1867)
- Patellaria desertorum Kravtzev (1955)
- Patellaria euphorbiae R.Rao (1969)
- Patellaria eximia Syd. (1935)
- Patellaria finkii Petr. (1923)
- Patellaria fusca Wallr. (1829)
- Patellaria glycosmidis Tilak & Srinivas. (1968)
- Patellaria gregaria Kirschst. (1910)
- Patellaria henningsii Ranoj. (1910)
- Patellaria ipomoeae R.Rao (1967)
- Patellaria jamaicensis Dennis (1954)
- Patellaria lantanae R.Rao (1967)
- Patellaria lasiosiphonis Tilak & Srinivas. (1974)
- Patellaria lathyri Velen. (1934)
- Patellaria maura (W.Phillips & Plowr.) W.Phillips (1887)
- Patellaria myrticola Rehm (1900)
- Patellaria peckii House (1921)
- Patellaria pumilio Velen. (1934)
- Patellaria purpurea Petch (1925)
- Patellaria quercina Velen. (1934)
- Patellaria quercus Crous & R.K.Schumach. (2016)
- Patellaria schwarzmanniana Kazhieva (1974)
- Patellaria scutellaris (A.Massal.) Trevis. (1852)
- Patellaria similis W.R.Gerard (1874)
- Patellaria stirtonii (Zahlbr.) Ertz (2009)
- Patellaria subacerina Müll.Arg. (1886)
- Patellaria subatrata Rehm (1900)
- Patellaria submacrospora Rehm (1907)
- Patellaria subrotuliformis Jatta (1905)
- Patellaria tetraspora Massee & Morgan (1902)
