= Holmiella =

Scientific classification
- Kingdom: Fungi
- Division: Ascomycota
- Class: Dothideomycetes
- Order: Patellariales
- Family: Patellariaceae
- Genus: Holmiella; Petrini, Samuels & E. Müll. 1979

Species
- See text

Genus of fungi

Holmiella is a genus of fungi in the order Patellariales.

The genus name of Holmiella is in honour of Kerstin Holm (b.1924), a Swedish botanist (Mycology) who was married to architect Lennart Holm (1921 - 2012) and worked at Uppsala University.

The genus was circumscribed by Orlando Petrini, Gary Joseph Samuels and Emil Müller in Ber. Schweiz. Bot. Ges. vol.89 on page 83 in 1979.

According to the GBIF it has 6 species;

- Holmiella domackae
- Holmiella juniperi-semiglobosae Pem, Gafforov, Jeewon & K.D.Hyde
- Holmiella junipericola Pem, Gafforov, Jeewon & K.D.Hyde
- Holmiella macrospora (Bonar & E.K.Cash) Kutorga & D.Hawksw.
- Holmiella sabina (De Not.) Petrini, Samuels & E.Müll.
- Holmiella taurus
