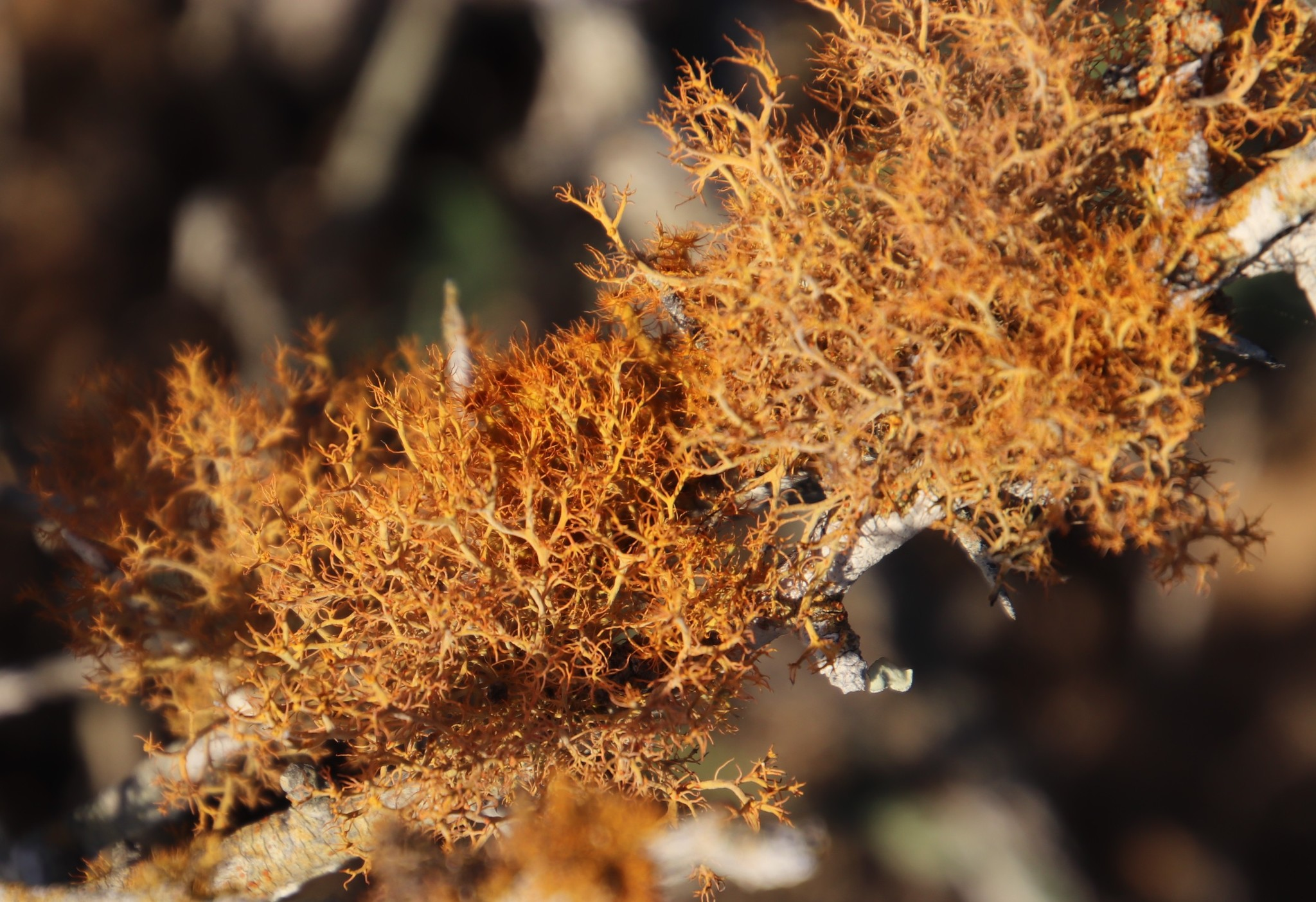

Scientific classification
- Domain: Eukaryota
- Kingdom: Fungi
- Division: Ascomycota
- Class: Lecanoromycetes
- Order: Teloschistales
- Family: Teloschistaceae
- Genus: Teloschistes
- Species: T. capensis

Binomial name
- Teloschistes capensis (L.f.) Müll.Arg. (1911)

Synonyms
- Lichen capensis L.f. (1781)

= Teloschistes capensis =

Species of lichen

Teloschistes capensis, commonly known as the Cape hair lichen, is a species of fruticose lichen in the family Teloschistaceae. It is endemic to the Atlantic coast in Namibia and South Africa.

== Taxonomy ==
The lichen was first scientifically described in 1781 by Carl Linnaeus the Younger. Johannes Müller Argoviensis transferred the taxon to the genus Teloschistes in 1911.

== Description ==
The Teloschistes capensis is a type of fruticose, or shrubby, lichen, typically growing upright and ranging from 3 to 8 cm in height. Its densely branched structure features main branches about 0.5 mm in diameter, which can be either circular or angularly rounded in cross-section. These main branches are sometimes marked by longitudinal stripes or grooves and have a texture that ranges from dull and smooth to slightly hairy. Their colour varies from orange to yellow or greyish. This species does not produce soralia or isidia, which are propagules related to reproduction and dispersion in lichens.

The thinner secondary branches of Teloschistes capensis share the same colour palette but end in fibrils, or small fibres, that are 1 to 2 mm long and coloured orange to yellow-grey. The lichen frequently bears apothecia, which are the lichen's spore-producing structures. These appear on the sides or near the ends of the branches and are stalkless, measuring 1 to 2 mm across. In their early stages, these apothecia look like small, orange-red bumps and develop into either flat or slightly concave discs. The discs are orange-red, typically darker than the rest of the thallus, and are surrounded by a prominent margin covered with numerous long, yellow to orange fibrils.

Inside these apothecia, the asci (spore-producing cells) are club-shaped, measuring 48–52 by 12–14 μm. The ascospores, which are the reproductive cells produced by the asci, are two-celled, and their shape ranges from ellipsoid to almost spindle-like. These spores measure between 8.5 and 14 μm in width and 45.5 μm in length.
