= Lahmiomyces =

Scientific classification
- Kingdom: Fungi
- Division: Ascomycota
- Class: Leotiomycetes
- Order: Helotiales
- Family: incertae sedis
- Genus: Lahmiomyces; Cif. & Tomas.

Type species
- Lahmiomyces piceae Cif. & Tomas.

Genus of fungi

Lahmiomyces is a genus of fungi in the Helotiales order. The relationship of this taxon to other taxa within the order is unknown (incertae sedis), and it has not yet been placed with certainty into any family. This is a monotypic genus, containing the single species Lahmiomyces piceae.

The genus name of Lahmiomyces is in honour of Johann Gottlieb Franz-Xaver Lahm (1811-1888), who was a German clergyman and botanist (Lichenology and Mycology). The genus of Lahmiomyces was circumscribed by Raffaele Ciferri and Ruggero Tomaselli in Ist. Bot. Univ. Lab. Crittog. Pavia Atti ser.5, vol.10 (Issue 1) on pages 39 and 66 in 1953.
