= Telimena =

Scientific classification
- Kingdom: Fungi
- Division: Ascomycota
- Class: Sordariomycetes
- Order: Phyllachorales
- Family: Phyllachoraceae
- Genus: Telimena; Racib.

Type species
- Telimena erythrinae Racib.

Genus of fungi

Telimena is a genus of fungi in the family Phyllachoraceae.
