= Thyriopsis =

Scientific classification
- Kingdom: Fungi
- Division: Ascomycota
- Class: Dothideomycetes
- Order: Asterinales
- Family: Asterinaceae
- Genus: Thyriopsis; Theiss. & Syd.

Type species
- Thyriopsis halepensis (Cooke) Theiss. & Syd.

Genus of fungi

Thyriopsis is a genus of fungi in the Asterinaceae family. The relationship of this taxon to other taxa within the class is unknown (incertae sedis), and it has not yet been placed with certainty into any order.
