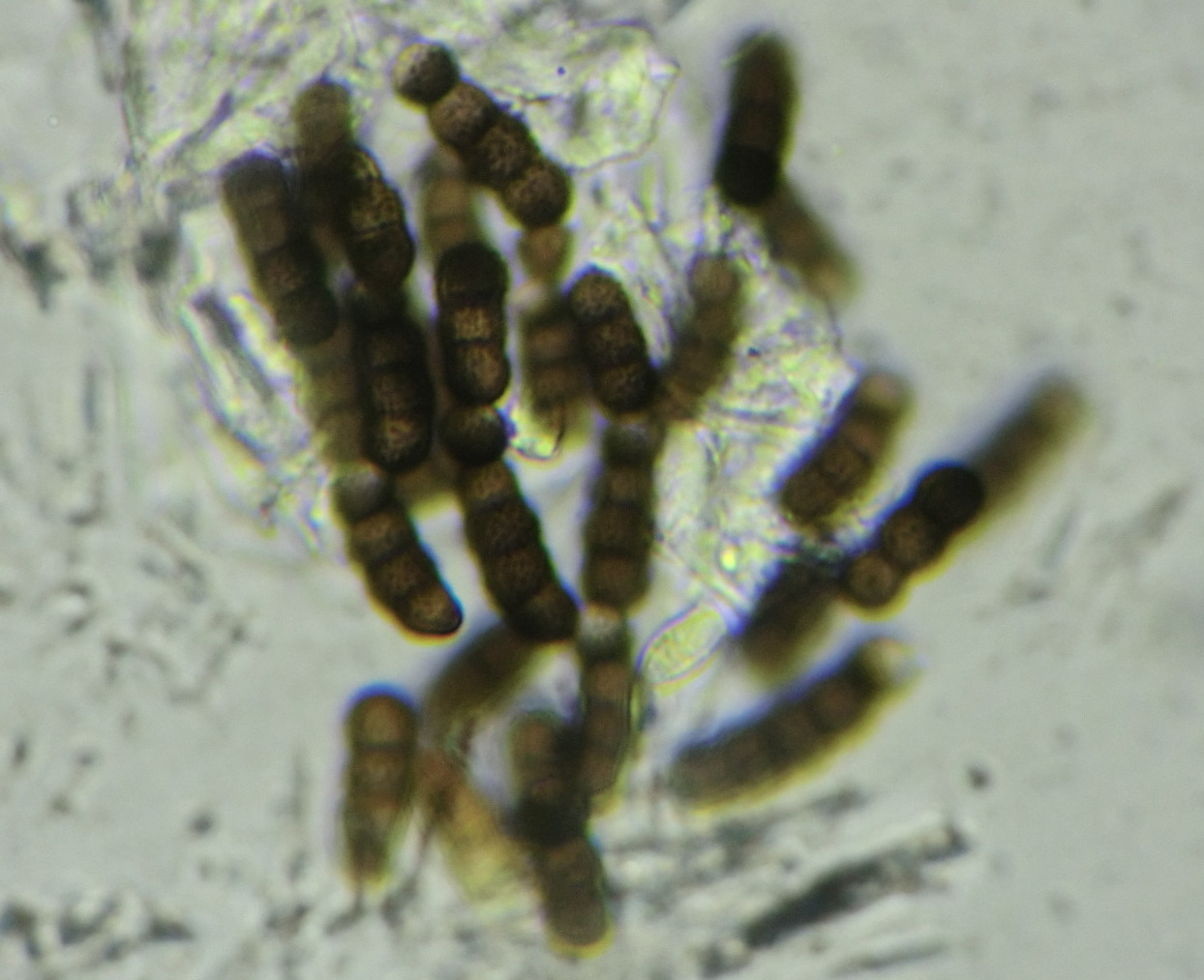

Scientific classification
- Kingdom: Fungi
- Division: Ascomycota
- Class: Dothideomycetes
- Order: Pleosporales
- Family: Torulaceae
- Genus: Torula
- Species: T. herbarum

Binomial name
- Torula herbarum (Pers.) Link (1809)

Synonyms
- Monilia herbarum Pers. (1801); Torula monilis Pers. (Usteri) (1795); Torula herbarum f. quaternella Sacc. (1913); Torula herbarum var. cereicola Speg. (1921)

= Torula herbarum =

Species of fungus

Torula herbarum is a darkly-pigmented filamentous fungus. It is often included in the unrelated but morphologically similar group of fungi known as sooty molds. It was first described by German mycologist Christiaan Hendrik Persoon in the genus Monilinia based on similarity to the agent of brown rot of stone fruit but later transferred to the genus Torula by Johann Heinrich Friedrich Link. Conidia of T. herbarum are dark brown or olivaceous colour and have a distinctive shape and number of cells. T. herbarum produces secondary metabolites with cytotoxic activity towards bacteria and human cancer cells.

== History and taxonomy ==
Torula herbarum was first described by Christiaan Hendrik Persoon under the genus Monilia or Monilinia, in 1801 in Göttingen. In 1809, Johann Heinrich Friedrich Link transferred the fungus to the genus Torula, as T. herbarum. Several forms and variations of T. herbarum have been named, including T. herbarum f. quaternella in 1913 and T. herbarum var. cereicola in 1921.

== Growth and morphology ==
The genus Torula is defined as dematiaceous hyphomycetes, or more commonly, darkly pigmented fungi that grow slowly and reproduce asexually by conidia in string of beads-like chains. The fungal colonies are variable in size. They can range from 1–2 mm diameter patches to covering large areas and encircling stems. They appear to be olivaceous (musky yellow green) in colour when growing and dark brown when matured. They are discrete, dry and have a felty, fuzzy and velvety appearance.

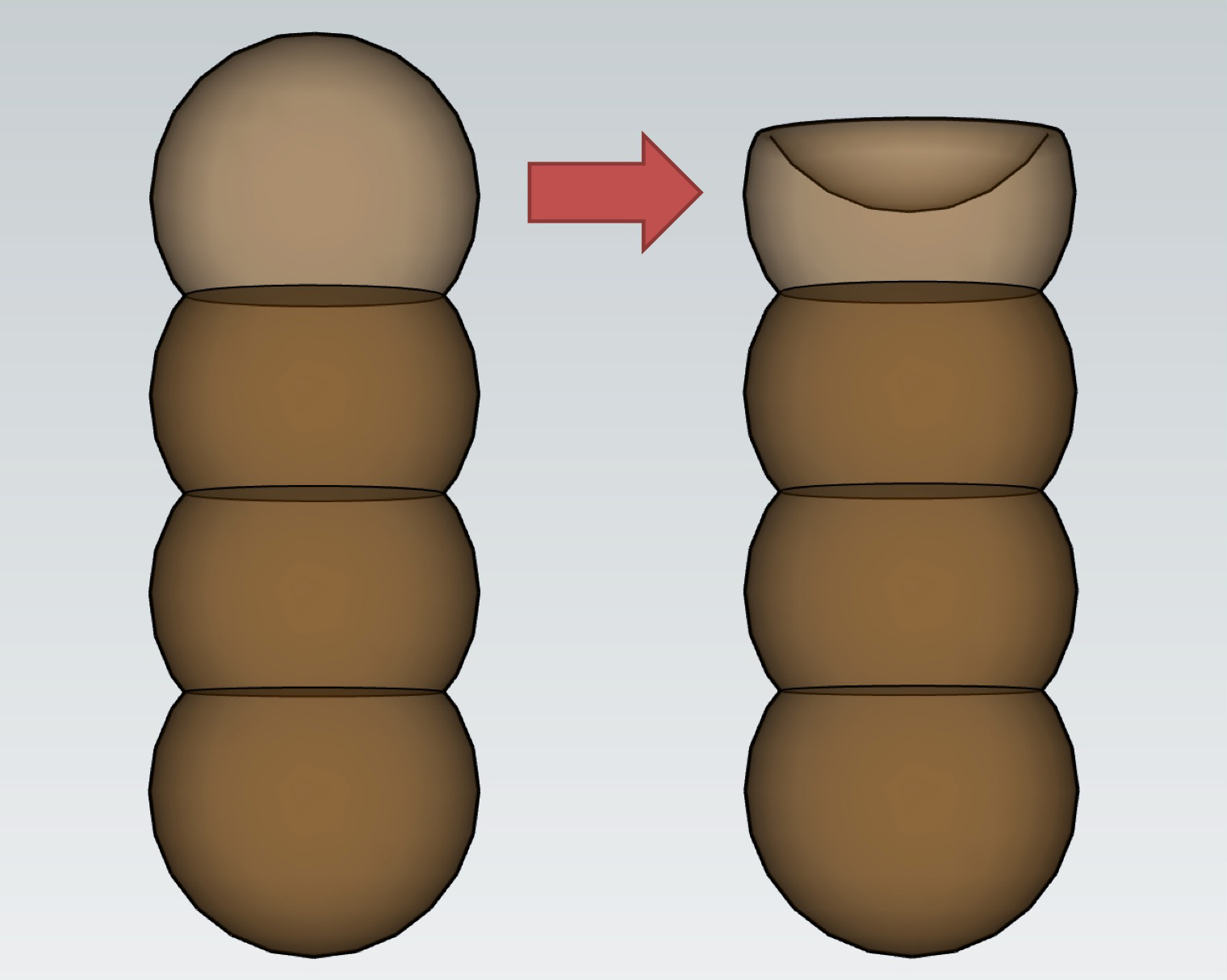
Diagram depicting formation of corona cell in Torula herbarum

The mycelium can be superficial or immersed and hyaline branched, relative to the rest of the structure. They are unbranched and usually colourless or a mid-brown colour. They appear to be smooth and 2-6 μm in diameter. Some other reports state they are wider, darker and thicker cells. The conidiophores will become the conidiogenous (promotes conidiogenesis) cells that are 7-9 μm in diameter, monoblastic (single or single-celled) or polyblastic (multiple celled). The conidiophores are globose or ellipsoidal (football shape), smooth and slightly bumpy at the fertile end.

In culture, colonies can cover an entire Petri dish of suitable growth medium after 2 weeks of incubation at 25 °C. Colonies are flat, smooth and distributed evenly with moderate aerial mycelium and a distinct edge. The colour is olivaceous-grey on the reverse side and paler on the surface when grown on Potato dextrose agar (PDA) and Malt Extract Agar (MEA) plates.

The conidia of T. herbarum are typically 3-5 celled, dark brown or black colour and rough-walled with prickly or spiny ornamentation resembling a burned crust appearance. The apical cell is usually more lightly pigmented than the lower cells, and at maturity it tends to collapse inward forming a characteristic structure called a "corona (crown) cell". The conidia are dry and form in unbranched or branched chains the break apart readily. with textured walls either like studded elevations or smaller pricks or spines. The chains may have a zig-zag pattern where one branch is more dominant (sympodial growth).

== Habitat and ecology ==
T. herbarum is a cosmopolitan species that is most commonly found in temperate climate regions, and exists in most areas with a suitable climate, including: Canada, India, United States of America, Cuba, Kenya, India, etc. It thrives on plant debris, on trees and in soil, often on or in dead herbaceous stems. It is a rot fungus that creates dark brown lesions sometimes in bands. A blight disease of ber, Ziziphus mauritiana, is caused by T. herbarum. In one study, T. herbarum accounted for 47% of the fungi recovered from earthworm casts and 6% of the mycota from non-earthworm associated soils. Less commonly, it can be found on wood and calcareous and siliceous rocks as well. Accordingly, items made out of those materials such as baskets, wood furniture, paper, tiles, linoleum and concrete may contain spores of this species. In autumn, T. herbarum grows on large dry stems of herbs. The main method of transmission is by dissemination of the conidia components of this fungus making them present in the air. Hyphal fragments of T. herbarum have been recovered from marine air above the Mediterranean Sea. T. herbarum is frequently found on plant hosts in the genera: Alnus, Aceuthobium, Bambusa Carya, Impatiens, Juncus, Mesembryanthemum, Pinus, and Yucca. Owing in part to their abundance in the air, conidia of T. herbarum contributing to seasonal fungal allergy in some people. The weather and seasonal changes can affect how many conidia are present in the environment. The exposure of the fungal spores outdoors and indoors can lead to lower airway allergies.

== Physiology ==
T. herbarum grows at temperatures of 24–28 °C (75–82 °F). Growth is absent below -5 °C and above 37 °C. T. herbarum is a secondary colonizer meaning it typically only establishes growth on a surface already subject to colonization by other fungi. It is occurs in both aquatic and terrestrial ecosystems subject to highly humid or even wet conditions. T. herbarum is capable of decomposing soil and organic materials, including paper and can biodeteriorate marble. It can breakdown lignin and decompose leaf litter. T. herbarum was given the common name, "Herb Clinging Fibre" by Samuel Gray in 1821; although few of Gray's many proposed common names for microfungi, including this one, were ever adopted.

A number of DNA sequences are available for this fungus including:

Gene	Partial Sequence	Date of Identification	Gene Accession Code
28S rRNA gene	853 bp linear DNA sequence	Aug 19, 2018	LT963455
KNU17-5 large subunit ribosomal RNA gene	970 bp linear DNA sequence	Apr 23, 2018	MH225777
CBS 246.57 large subunit ribosomal RNA gene	918 bp linear DNA sequence	Nov 8, 2018	MH869251
HBUM07134 18S ribosomal RNA gene	1029 bp linear DNA sequence	Jul 1, 2018	MF662283

T. herbarum forms the biocompounds, herabin and its derivatives, O-methylherbarin and dehydroherbarin. Herbarin is a neutral compound with composition C_{16}H_{16}O_{6}. Herbarin and dehydroherbarin possess weak antimicrobial effects and they are chemicals that belong to a class of pigments, where a Naphthoquinone moiety is fused with at positions 1 and 2 on an oxacyclohexene (chemical structure) ring. O-methylherbarin is also a compound that belongs to the Naphthoquinone pigments. Herbarone is a heptaketide that was also found to be produced by T. herbarum associated with a sea hare.

== Biotechnological application ==
Torula herbarum produces several secondary metabolites like Herbarin, Dehydroherbarin, O-Methylherbarin. Dehydroherbarin and herbarin displayed weak antibacterial, antifungal effects and antiamoebic activity for Entamoeba histolytica. The compound dehydroherbarin was found to exhibit antimicrobial, antiparasitic, and phytotoxic effects. Research has demonstrated dehydroherbarin to have antiviral activity for Hepatitis A virus. It is antimicrobial to many species of bacteria including Staphylococcus aureus and Escherichia coli. Herbarin, did not show as strong of an antimicrobial ability. When these two chemicals were tested for cytotoxicity, they showed a reduced effect towards the normal cell line but a higher effect against the breast cancer cells. Dehydroherbarin and herbarin bind to human heat shock protein 90 alpha and DNA Topoisomerase I through hydrogen bonds, 3 and 5 bonds, respectively, suggesting potential as anti-cancer agents.
