= Trichothecium =

Scientific classification
- Domain: Eukaryota
- Kingdom: Fungi
- Division: Ascomycota
- Class: Sordariomycetes
- Order: Hypocreales
- Genus: Trichothecium; Link

Genus of fungi

Trichothecium is a genus of fungi with unknown place in classification.

The genus was first described by Johann Heinrich Friedrich Link in 1809.

The genus has cosmopolitan distribution.

Species:

- Trichothecium roseum
