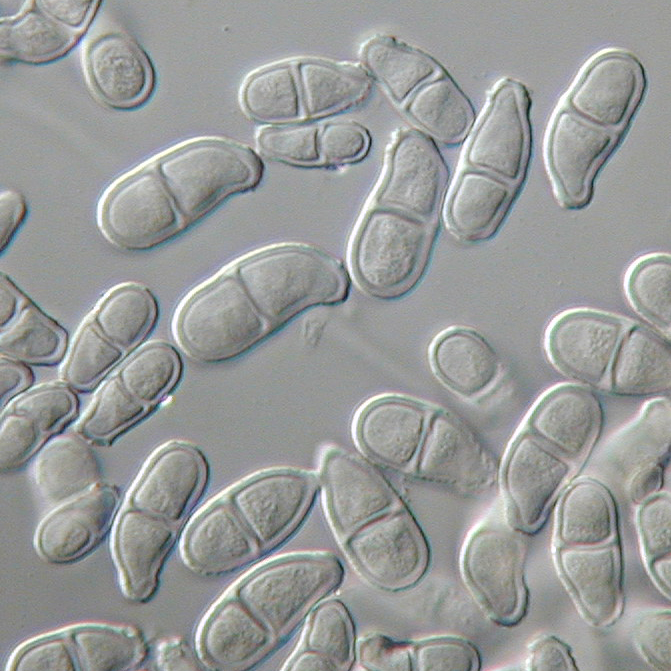

Scientific classification
- Kingdom: Fungi
- Division: Ascomycota
- Class: Sordariomycetes
- Order: Hypocreales
- Family: incertae sedis
- Genus: Trichothecium
- Species: T. roseum

Binomial name
- Trichothecium roseum (Pers.) Link (1809)

Synonyms
- Trichoderma roseum Pers. (1794); Hyphelia rosea (Pers.) Fr. (1825); Puccinia rosea (Pers.) Corda (1837); Cephalothecium roseum (Pers.) Corda (1838); Dactylium roseum Pers. (1841)

= Trichothecium roseum =

Species of fungus

Trichothecium roseum is a fungus in the division Ascomycota first reported in 1809. It is characterized by its flat and granular colonies which are initially white and develop to be light pink in color. This fungus reproduces asexually through the formation of conidia with no known sexual state. Trichothecium roseum is distinctive from other species of the genus Trichothecium in its characteristic zigzag patterned chained conidia. It is found in various countries worldwide and can grow in a variety of habitats ranging from leaf litter to fruit crops. Trichothecium roseum produces a wide variety of secondary metabolites including mycotoxins, such as roseotoxins and trichothecenes, which can infect and spoil a variety of fruit crops. It can act as both a secondary and opportunistic pathogen by causing pink rot on various fruits and vegetables and thus has an economical impact on the farming industry. Secondary metabolites of T. roseum, specifically Trichothecinol A, are being investigated as potential anti-metastatic drugs. Several agents including harpin, silicon oxide, and sodium silicate are potential inhibitors of T. roseum growth on fruit crops. Trichothecium roseum is mainly a plant pathogen and has yet to show a significant impact on human health.

== History and classification ==
The genus Trichothecium is small and heterogeneous comprising seventy-three recorded species. This genus was first reported in 1809. The main members of the genus include Trichothecium polybrochum, Trichothecium cystosporium, Trichothecium pravicovi, and Trichothecium roseum. Trichothecium roseum has morphologically different conidiophores and conidia than the other three main species, which made development of these features the center of extensive study throughout the years. Since Trichothecium fungi lack a sexual phase, systematic classification was not uniform following their discovery. These fungi were initially grouped into Fungi imperfecti under the form classification Deuteromycetes. In 1958, Tubaki expanded Hughes' classification of soil Hyphomycetes, part of the form class of Fungi imperfecti, by adding a ninth section in order to accommodate T. roseum and its unique conidial apparatus. Trichothecium has now been classified under the class Sordariomycetes, phylum Ascomycota.

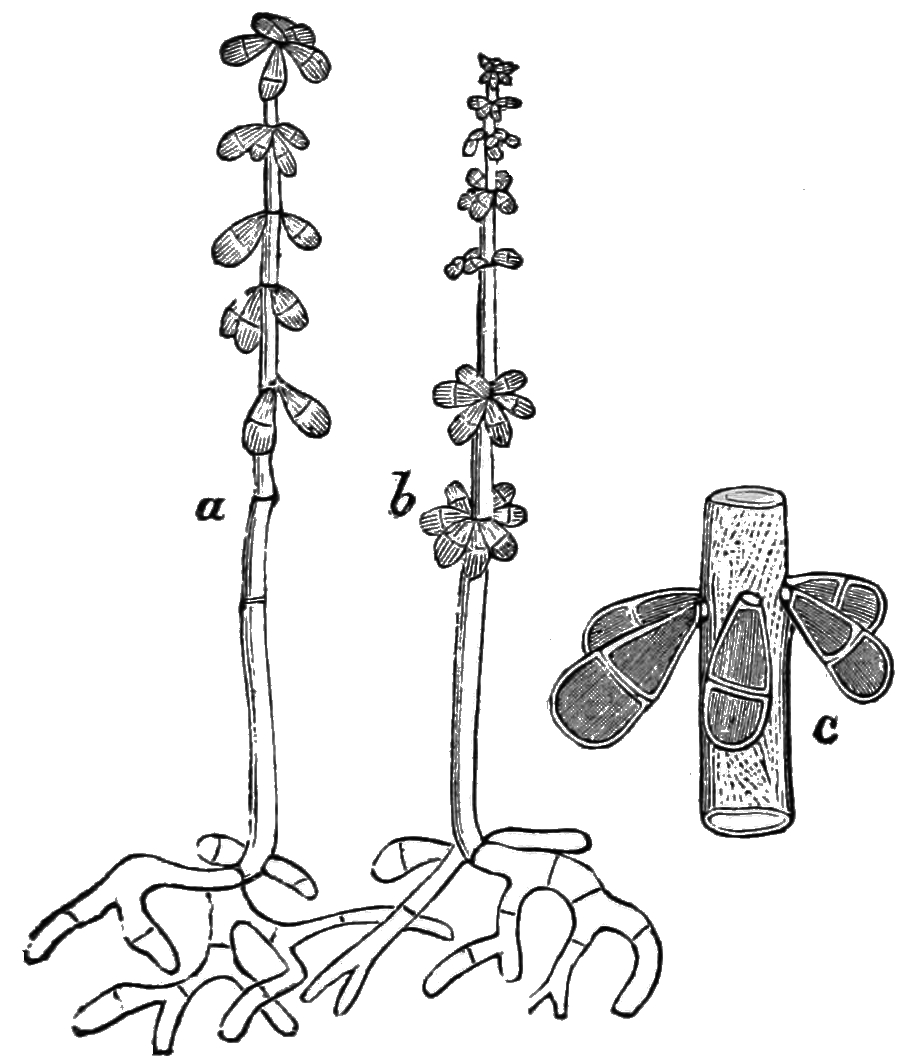
Trichothecium roseum conidiophore depicted in line drawing from Popular Science Monthly Vol 9 (1876).

== Morphology ==
Trichothecium roseum colonies are flat, granular, and powdery in appearance. The color of the colonies appears to be white initially and develop into a light pink to peach color. The genus Trichothecium is characterized by its pinkish colored colonies.

Conidiophores of T. roseum are usually erect and are 200-300μm in length. They arise singly or in loose groups. Conidiophores are simple hyphae, which are septate in their lower half, and bear clusters of conidia at the tip. These conidiophores are indistinguishable from vegetative hyphae until production of the first conidium. Conidium development is distinctive and was first described by Ingold in 1956. Conidia arise as blowouts from the side of the conidiophore apex which is thus incorporated into the base of each spore. After the first conidium is blown out, before it matures, the apex of the conidiophore directly below blows out a second conidium from the opposite side. Conidia are pinched out from the conidiophore one after another in alternating directions in order to form the characteristic zigzag patterned chain. Conidia of T.roseum (15-20 × 7.5-10 μm) are smooth and clavate. Each conidium is two celled with the apical cell being larger than the curved basal cell. Conidia are light pink and appear translucent under the microscope. They appear a more saturated pink colour when grown in masses in culture or on the host surface.

== Growth and physiology ==
Trichothecium roseum reproduces asexually by the formation of conidia with no known sexual stage. Trichothecium roseum is relatively fast-growing as it can form colonies reaching 9 cm (4 in) in diameter in ten days at 20 °C (68 °F) on malt extract agar. This fungus grows optimally at 25 °C (77 °F) with a minimum and maximum growing temperature of 15 °C (59 °F) and 35 °C (95 °F) respectively. Trichothecium roseum can tolerate a wide pH range but grows optimally at a pH of 6.0. Sporulation occurs rapidly at pH 4.0-6.5 and a combination of low temperature (15 °C (59 °F)) and high glucose concentration can increase the size of conidia. Treatment of T. roseum with colchicine increases the number of nuclei in conidia, growth rate, and biosynthetic activities. There are a variety of sugars that T. roseum can utilize including D-fructose, sucrose, maltose, lactose, raffinose, D-galactose, D-glucose, arabinose, and D-mannitol. Good growth also occurs in the presence of various amino acids including L-methionine, L-isoleucine, L-tryptophan, L-alanine, L-norvaline, and L-norleucine.

=== Secondary metabolites ===
Trichothecium roseum can produce numerous secondary metabolites that include toxins, antibiotics, and other biologically active compounds. Diterpenoids produced include rosolactone, rosolactone acetate, rosenonolactone, desoxyrosenonolactone, hydroxyrosenonolactones, and acetoxy-rosenonolactone. Several sesquiterpenoids are also produced by T. roseum including crotocin, trichothecolone, trichothecin, trichodiol A, trichothecinol A/B/C, trichodiene, and roseotoxin.

=== Biomedical applications ===
Trichothecium roseum was found to antagonize pathogenic fungi, such as Pyricularia oryzae (Magnaporthe oryzae) and the oomycete Phytophthora infestans, in vitro. It was suggested that the antifungal compound trichothecin was the main contributor to this action. In other studies trichothecinol B isolated from T. roseum displayed modest antifungal activity against Cryptococcus albidus and Saccharomyces cerevisiae.

Various studies have indicated that Trichothecinol A isolated from T. roseum strongly inhibited TPA-induced tumour promotion on mouse skin in carcinogenesis tests and therefore may be valuable for further investigation as cancer preventive agent. Anti-cancer studies have also shown that Trichothecinol A significantly inhibits cancer cell migration and therefore can be developed as a potential new anti-metastatic drug.

== Habitat and ecology ==
Trichothecium roseum is a saprophyte and is found worldwide. It has been found in soils in various countries including Poland, Denmark, France, Russia, Turkey, Israel, Egypt, the Sahara, Chad, Democratic Republic of the Congo, central Africa, Australia, Polynesia, India, China, and Panama. Known habitats of T. roseum include uncultivated soils, forest nurseries, forest soils under beech trees, teak, cultivated soils with legumes, citrus plantations, heathland, dunes, salt-marshes, and garden compost. Commonly, this fungus can be isolated from the tree leaf litter of various trees including birch, pine, fir, cotton, and palm. It has also been isolated from several food sources such as barley, wheat, oats, maize, apples, grapes, meat products, cheese, beans, hazelnuts, pecans, pistachios, peanuts, and coffee. Levels of T. roseum in foods other than fruits are generally low.

== Plant pathology ==
There are approximately two hundred twenty-two different plant hosts of T. roseum found worldwide. Trichothecium roseum causes pink rot on various fruits and vegetables. It is considered both a secondary and opportunistic pathogen since it tends to enter the fruit/vegetable host through lesions that were caused by a primary pathogen. Disease caused by this fungus is characterized by the development of white powdery mold that eventually turns pink. Antagonistic behaviours of T. roseum with certain plant pathogenic fungi was reported by Koch in 1934. He started that T. roseum actively parasitized stroma of Dibotryon morbosum which causes black knot disease in cherry, plum, and apricot trees.

=== Apple disease ===
Trichothecium roseum is known to produce pink rot on apples particularly following an apple scab infection caused by Venturia inaequalis. Studies have shown that roseotoxin B, a secondary metabolite of T. roseum, can penetrate apple peels and cause lesions. Trichothecium roseum also causes apple core rot which is a serious problem in China. Core rot not only causes economic loss but it is also associated with high levels of mycotoxin production. There have been reports of the presence of trichothecenes, specifically T-2 toxin, in infected apples in China. T-2 toxin has the highest toxicity of the trichothecenes and poses a threat to individuals who consume these infected apples due to its carcinogenicity, neurotoxicity, and immunotoxicity.

=== Grape disease ===
Trichothecium roseum was identified, along with Acremonium acutatum, as the two strains of pathogenic fungi which caused white stains on harvested grapes in Korea. The presence of mycelia on the surface of the grapes resulted in a white stained, powdery mildew appearance. Trichothecium roseum was identified using fungal morphology and nucleotide sequencing by PCR. It appears as though the fungus covers the surface of the grape only and does not penetrate into the tissue. This stain lowers the quality of the grapes and causes serious economic losses.

Trichothecin, trichothecolone, and rosenonolactone, which are secondary metabolites of T. roseum, were detected in wines. Presence of small quantities of trichothecin can inhibit alcohol fermentation. Trichothecium roseum rot has been reported to be increasing in wineries in Portugal. In this case, T. roseum appeared to grow over rotten grapes that were infected with gray rot. Mycotoxins were only detected in wines that were made with grapes that had gray rot and thus these toxins may be indicators of poor quality grapes. Grape contamination by T. roseum appears to be prominent in temperate climates.

=== Other fruit disease ===
Cases of T. roseum pink rot have been reported on numerous other fruits, however detailed studies have yet to be pursued. Pink T. roseum rot has been reported on tomatoes in Korea and Pakistan. It also causes pink rot in muskmelons and watermelons in Japan, the United States, South America, India, and the United Kingdom. Trichothecium roseum is reported to grow also on bananas and peaches.

== Prevention of plant disease ==
Preventative measures can be taken to avoid growth of T. roseum in fruit crops. These include ensuring adequate ventilation in the storage facility, avoiding injuring and bruising the fruit, and ensuring adequate storage temperatures. Pre- and postharvest applications have been suggested as measures to control T. roseum production on fruit crops. In particular, studies have been done on testing various compounds to prevent T. roseum growth on several melon types. Harpin was inoculated on harvested Hami melons and caused significantly reduced lesion diameter and thus decreased T. roseum growth. Silicon oxide and sodium silicate also reduced the severity of pink rot and lesion diameter in harvested Hami melons. Pre-harvest inoculation of harpin on muskmelons decreased the amount of pink rot caused by T. roseum on harvested melons.
