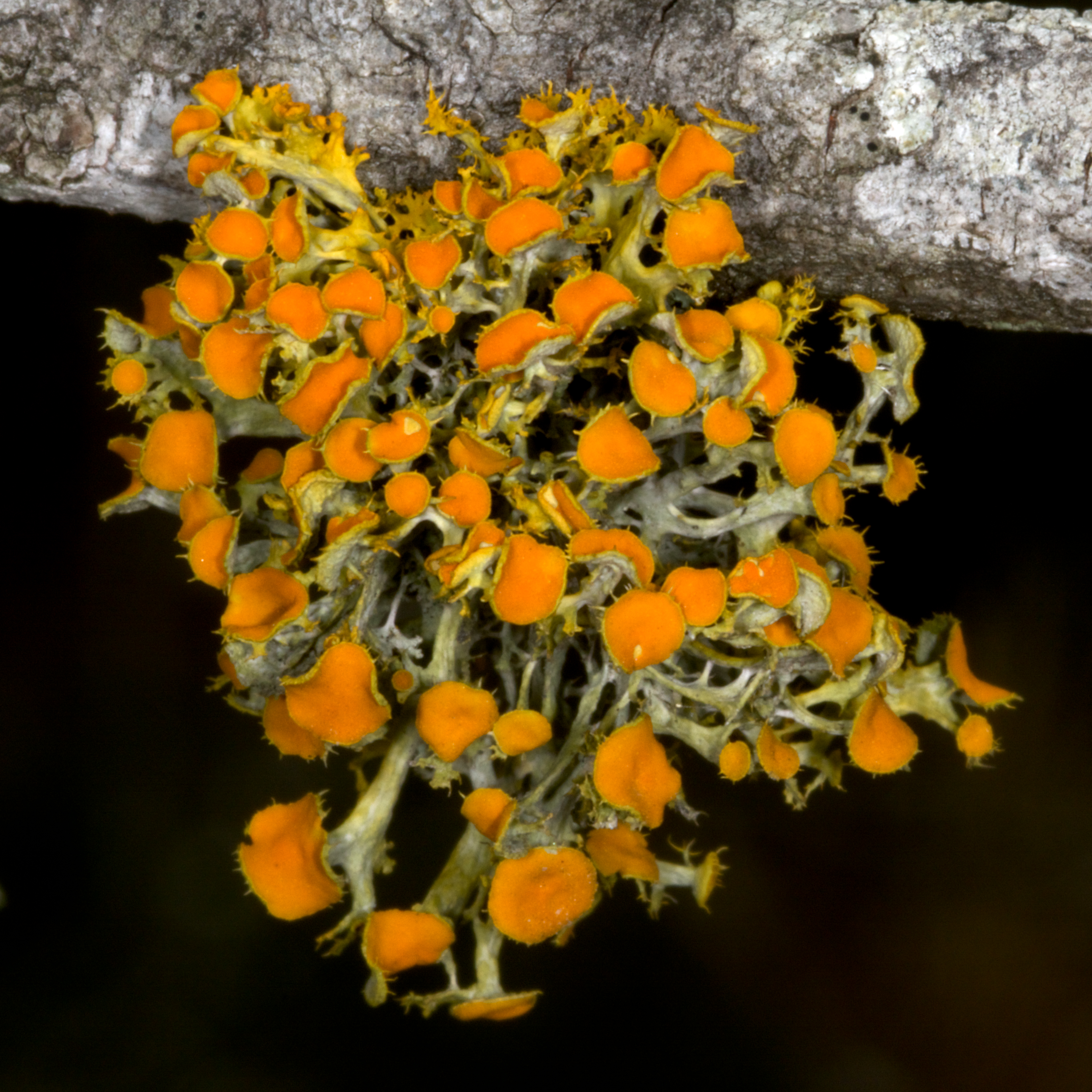

Conservation status
- Apparently Secure (NatureServe)

Scientific classification
- Kingdom: Fungi
- Division: Ascomycota
- Class: Lecanoromycetes
- Order: Teloschistales
- Family: Teloschistaceae
- Genus: Teloschistes
- Species: T. chrysophthalmus

Binomial name
- Teloschistes chrysophthalmus (L.) Th.Fr. (1861)

Synonyms
- Lichen chrysophtalmos L. (1771)

= Teloschistes chrysophthalmus =

Species of fungus

Teloschistes chrysophthalmus, often referred to as the gold-eye lichen or golden-eye, is a fruticose lichen with branching lobes. Their sexual structures, apothecia, are bright-orange with spiny projections (cilia) situated around the rim. It has a global distribution, but is often localized and rare in many parts of its range. Colonies most often form along coastal areas.

It is a twig species, meaning that it grows on twigs. It is rarely abundant. Several sites were discovered along the coast of England during 2012 and 2013, where the hosts include hawthorn and apple trees. In America it is known to grow on California live oak, dwarf coyote brush, Peritoma arborea, and magnolias.

This species has been studied for anti-viral secondary metabolites and was found to contain parietin which exhibits virucidal effects against certain arenaviruses (Arenaviridae).
