= Bulleraceae =

Scientific classification
- Kingdom: Fungi
- Division: Basidiomycota
- Class: Tremellomycetes
- Order: Tremellales
- Family: Bulleraceae; X.Z.Liu, F.Y.Bai, M.Groenew. & Boekhout (2015)

Genera
- Bullera; Fonsecazyma; Genolevuria; Pseudotremella

Genus of fungi

The Bulleraceae are a family of fungi in the order Tremellales. The family currently contains four genera. Some species produce gelatinous basidiocarps and were formerly placed in the genus Tremella. Most, however, are only known from their yeast states.
