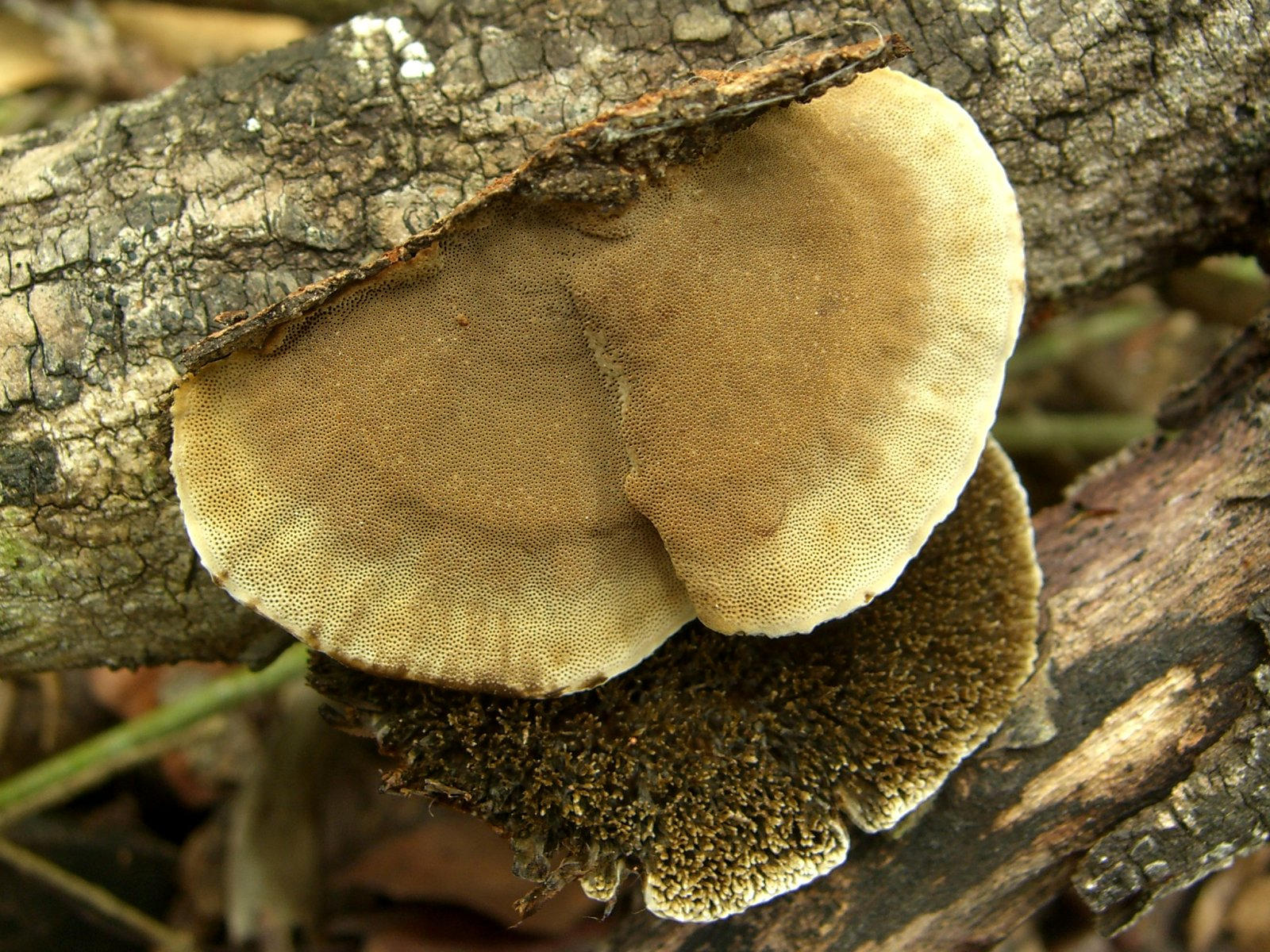

Scientific classification
- Kingdom: Fungi
- Division: Basidiomycota
- Class: Agaricomycetes
- Order: Polyporales
- Family: Polyporaceae
- Genus: Hexagonia
- Species: H. hydnoides

Binomial name
- Hexagonia hydnoides (Sw.) M.Fidalgo

Synonyms
- Species synonymy: Boletus fibrosus Hook., (1822); Boletus hydnoides Sw., (1806); Boletus ursinus Link, (1809); Cerrena hydnoides (Sw.) Zmitr., (2001); Microporus ursinus (Link) Kuntze, (1898); Pogonomyces hydnoides (Sw.) Murrill, (1904); Polyporus fibrosus Hook., (1822); Polyporus hydnoides (Sw.) Fr., (1821); Polyporus ursinus (Link) Fr., (1821); Polyporus verrucosohirtus Speg., (1884); Polystictus ursinus (Link) Fr., (1886); Polystictus verrucosohirtus (Speg.) Speg., (1888); Scenidium hydnoides (Sw.) Jülich [as 'hydnoideum'], (1983); Trametes hydnoides (Sw.) Fr., (1838); Trametes ocellata Berk. & M.A. Curtis, (1868); Trametes ursina (Link) Fr., (1849); Trametes verrucosohirtus (Speg.) Speg., (1891)

= Hexagonia hydnoides =

Species of fungus

Hexagonia hydnoides, also known as the hairy hexagonia, is a widely distributed species of bracket fungus in the Polyporaceae family. It is known to grow in tropical regions across the globe and to grow on dead wood tissues, particularly that of hardwoods. It is a plant pathogen and is largely saprophytic, decaying dead wood tissues.

== Taxonomy ==
Hexagonia hydnoides was placed within Boletus in its original description by Carl Linnaeus in 1753, along with most other fungi with poroid hymenia. The most recent widely accepted placement for the species is within Hexagonia.

It is disputed among researchers whether this species falls within the genus Cerrena or within the genus Hexagonia. A study published in 2001 reassigned this species to Cerrena, under the name Cerrena hydnoides. Species Fungorum lists Cerrena hydnoides as the currently accepted name for this species, but this is not reflected in all of the modern literature.

=== Phylogeny ===
In a phylogenetic study done in 2013 on various genera within the order Polyporales, it was shown that Hexagonia hydnoides is a sister lineage to Irpex lacteus and Emmia latemarginata. Further investigation within this study argued that H. hydnoides is microscopically distinct from other members of its genus (e.g. H. apiaria and H. hirta) due to an arboriform (tree-like) branching pattern and sclerohyphae with inflated axial elements – and suggested that the species be moved to Pogonomyces.

=== Etymology ===
The name comes from the species' distinctive dark hairy bristles found on the cap – hydnoides meaning 'relating to Hydnum', a genus of toothed fungi.

== Description ==
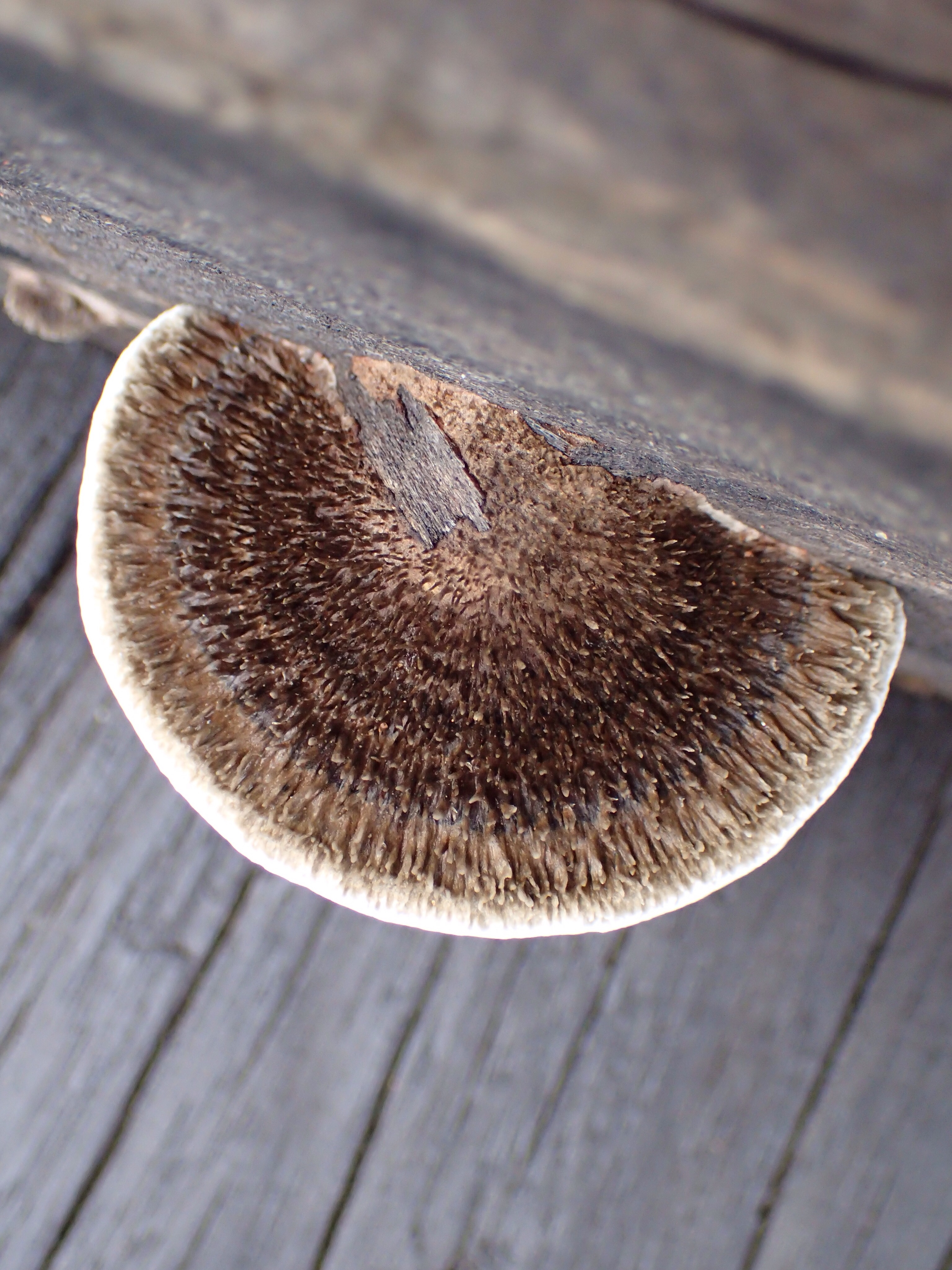
Upper surface with zonate marking visible

Hexagonia hydnoides forms annual semicircular fruiting bodies, with a sessile, or stalkless, attachment to dead wood, such as that of a fallen oak. The pileus, or cap, is convex or nearly flat and has been reported to be anywhere from 1 to 12 centimetres (1/2 to 4 1/2 in) across, and can be up to 1.8 cm thick at the base. The upper surface is zonate – having concentric striping patterns that can be faint to bright in coloration, and is otherwise brown or dark brown. The cap is distinctively covered in fine, dark brown to black bristles that dry and harden with age. The hymenium is brown to dark brown, and is composed of many thin, angular or hexagonal pores – 0.1 to 0.2 mm in diameter and running 2 to 6 mm deep. The hymenium darkens when rubbed. The flesh is tough and orangish-brown.

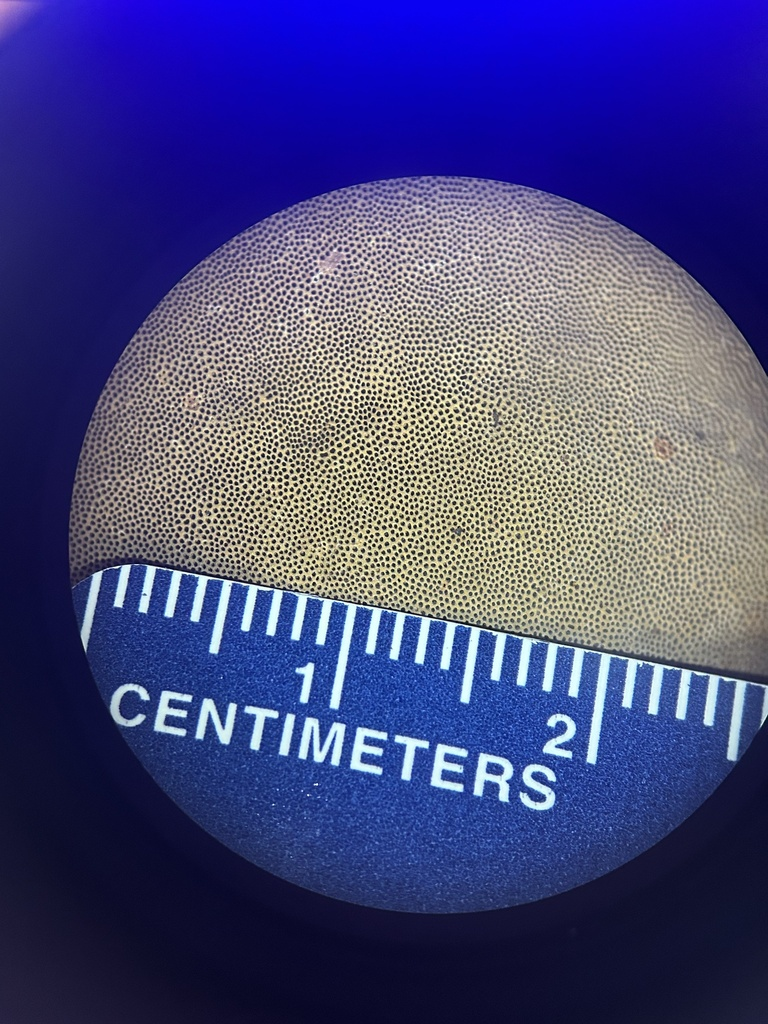
Hexagonia hydnoides pores under a stereo microscope

The microscopic morphology of this species includes spores that are 11–14 by 3.5–5 microns, which are cylindrical, smooth, hyaline/colorless, and inamyloid under Melzer's reagent. The hyphal system is trimitic, meaning that it contains generative, skeletal, and binding hyphae, and in addition has clamp connections present on the binding hyphae.

=== Similar species ===
Many species that can be confused with Hexagonia hydnoides include bracket fungi which lack a stipe – examples may be Trametes versicolor (the turkey-tail) along with other Trametes species, Fuscoporia gilva, or Daedaleopsis confragosa. Hexagonia hydnoides can sometimes be differentiated from lookalikes within the genus, notably H. hirta, by its much smaller pores and flat or slightly convex cap surface.

== Habitat and distribution ==
The fungus can largely be found on dead hardwood in tropical and subtropical forests, especially those in North America. Geographic data from iNaturalist shows that it has been sighted in the eastern United States, Mexico, Caribbean, Brazil, Spain, India, South Africa along with much of Central and South America and some Southern and East African countries.

== Ecology ==
Hexagonia hydnoides is saprobic, most commonly decaying fallen hardwood trees. It is a white rot fungus, meaning that it secretes enzymes that can break down components of the wood including cellulose, hemicellulose, and lignin, the latter of which is not digestible by some wood-decay fungi. This fungus is also known to be a plant pathogen, decaying living wood, although this has not been researched in depth.

== Traditional medicine ==
Although Hexagonia hydnoides is considered inedible due to its tough, woody texture, therapeutic compounds within the basidiocarp can be extracted for use in traditional herbal medicines such as teas through being ground into a powder.

A study published in 2021 analyzed the common knowledge, usage, and effects of various fungi in traditional medicine in rural Northeastern Brazilian communities. H. hydnoides was specifically cited for use as a solution to colic in infants, as an antispasmodic therapy for the digestive system. H. hydnoides was further analyzed and found to have antibacterial properties as a result of saponin compounds. A similar study found that extracts from H. hydnoides were effective as an antibacterial agent against Bacillus cereus.

The usage of H. hydnoides in traditional medicine is endangered by increased access to commercially produced medicines, loss of tradition throughout generations, and a decline in fungal species populations due to environmental factors such as deforestation, which is particularly relevant to H. hydnoides' use among populations in South America, especially regarding the gradual loss of Brazilian rainforests.

The fungus is also reported to be used in Mexico as a medicine for the treatment of pimples, warts, and ringworm.
