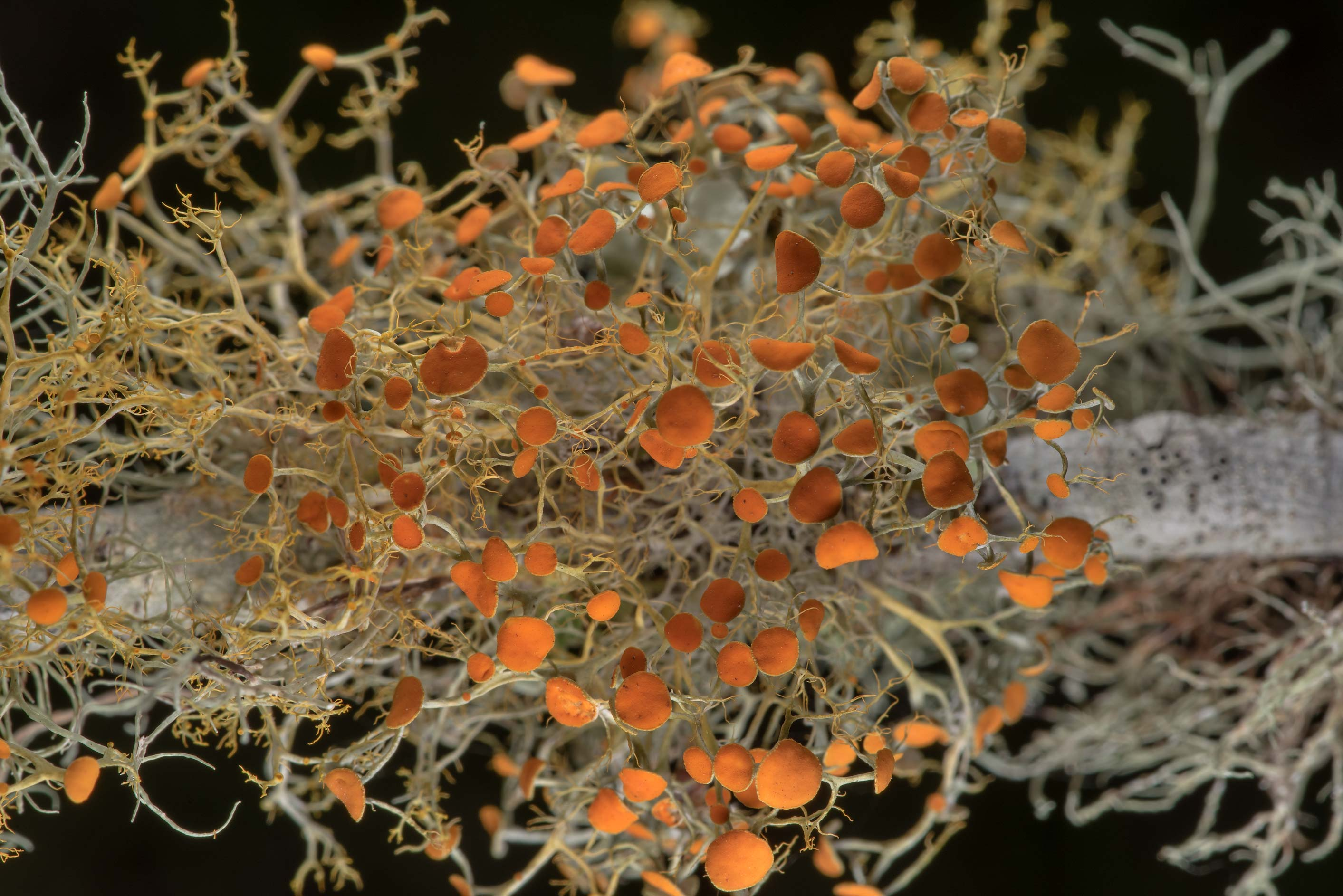

Conservation status
- Apparently Secure (NatureServe)

Scientific classification
- Domain: Eukaryota
- Kingdom: Fungi
- Division: Ascomycota
- Class: Lecanoromycetes
- Order: Teloschistales
- Family: Teloschistaceae
- Genus: Teloschistes
- Species: T. exilis

Binomial name
- Teloschistes exilis (Michx.) Vain. (1890)

Synonyms
- Physcia exilis Michx. (1803)

= Teloschistes exilis =

Species of lichen

Teloschistes exilis is a species of corticolous (bark-dwelling), fruticose lichen in the family Teloschistaceae. It was first formally described in 1803 by French botanist André Michaux, as Physcia exilis. Finnish lichenologist Edvard Vainio transferred the taxon to the genus Teloschistes in 1890. The lichen is found in the Americas. Secondary metabolites (lichen products) that have been identified from the lichen include parietin and teloschistin.

A form of the lichen described by Vilmos Kőfaragó-Gyelnik in 1938, Teloschistes exilis f. inaequalis Gyeln., has been proposed to represent a synonym of Teloschistes nodulifer, after researchers studied Kofarago-Gyelnik's original type material that was collected from Argentina.
