= Timeline of British botany =

This article lists (in chronological order) notable events in the history of botany in Britain.

== pre-1801 ==
- 1538 First British flora "Libellus de Herbaria" by William Turner's published.

"A new Herball, wherin are conteined the names of Herbes ... with the properties degrees and naturall places of the same, gathered and made by Wylliam Turner, Physicion unto the Duke of Somersettes Grace" is the complete name of his great work of botany. The first part was published in London, printed by Steven Myerdman in 1551), the second was published in 1562 and the third in 1568, both in exile in Germany, by Arnold Birckman of Cologne. These volumes were the first clear and systematic investigation of the plants of England. The work had admirable wood engravings (basically copied from Leonhart Fuchs' work De historia Stirpium, 1542) along with the detailed observations obtained by Turner in his field studies. At the same time, Turner included a list of the "uses and virtues" of plants and in the preface admits that he may be accused of disclosing to the general public what should have been reserved for a professional audience. Thus for the first time a flora of England in the vernacular was available, so that most English plants could easily be identified.

- 1597 John Gerard's Herball, or general historie of plants was published in London
- 1636 Enlarged edition of the Herball by Thomas Johnson
- 1644 Thomas Johnson (botanist) and author of Mercurius botanicus died in Hampshire
- 1649 John Wray John Ray was made a fellow at Trinity College, Cambridge, lecturing in Greek, Mathematics and Natural Science. He was the first to describe Monocotyledons and Dicotyledons, still used in Taxonomy today.
- 1650 William How's Phytologia Britannica was published in London
- 1682 John Ray published his theories as 'Methodus plantarum nova' and the three volume 'Historia generalis plantarum'. His worked formed the basis of much of Carl Linnaeus' theories despite the Swede deriding him publicly.

== 20th century ==
=== 1900s ===
- Frederick Hamilton Davey's Flora of Cornwall was published in Penzance

=== 1950s ===
- 1951: Diapensia lapponica, a new species for Britain, is found at Sgurr an Utha, Inverness-shire by C. F. Tebbutt

=== 1960s ===
- 1965 - The Concise British Flora by William Keble Martin was published in May.

=== 1980s ===
- 1986: Red Helleborine Cephalanthera rubra is found at Hawkley Warren, Hampshire by K. Turner and Ralph Hollins (by this time its known British range had declined to just two other sites)
