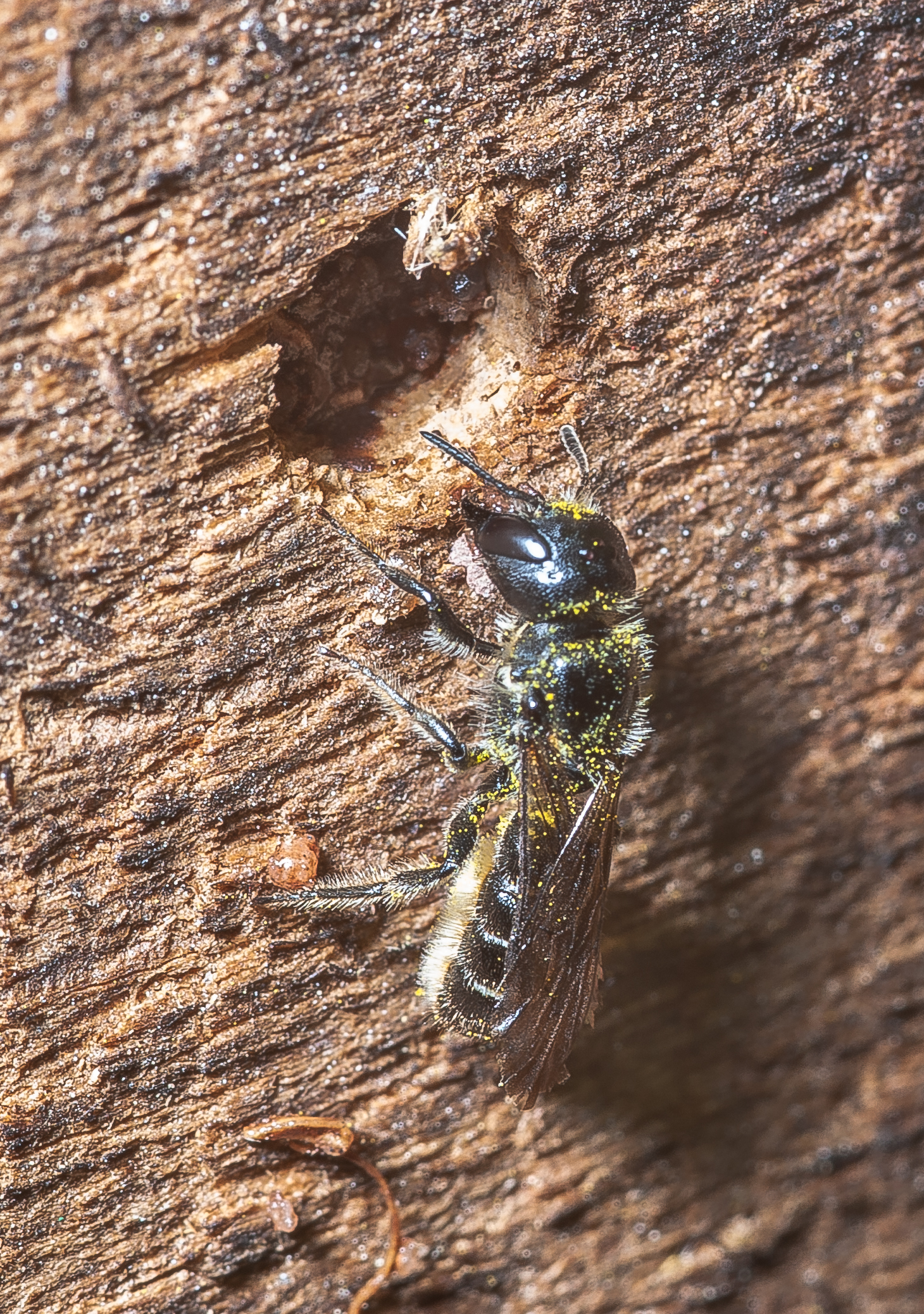
- Chelostoma florisomne, female

Scientific classification
- Kingdom: Animalia
- Phylum: Arthropoda
- Clade: Pancrustacea
- Class: Insecta
- Order: Hymenoptera
- Family: Megachilidae
- Genus: Chelostoma
- Species: C. florisomne

Binomial name
- Chelostoma florisomne (Linnaeus, 1758)

Synonyms
- Apis florisomnis Linnaeus, 1758; Apis maxillosa Linné, 1767; Chelostoma culmorum Lepeletier, 1841; Heriades parumcrinitus Alfken, 1932

= Chelostoma florisomne =

Species of bee

Chelostoma florisomne, the large scissor-bee, is a species of hymenopteran in the family Megachilidae.

== Etymology ==
The Latin species name florisomne refers to the habit of some males to sleep inside the buttercup flowers.

== Distribution and habitat ==
The area of distribution covers most of Europe (Austria, Belgium, British Islands, Czech Republic, Denmark, Finland, France, Germany, Hungary, Italy, Lithuania, Luxembourg, European Russia, Poland, Slovakia, Slovenia, Spain and Switzerland) and North Africa. These bees occur in forests, meadow, slopes and orchards, where buttercups (Ranunculus species) are present.

== Description ==
Chelostoma florisomne can reach a body length of about 7–11 mm (0.28–0.43 in). These bees have a slender, cylindrical shaped black body, with white short fringe bands along the posterior margins of the tergites, that are usually filled with pollen of the preferred pollen host. The head is subquadrate, with very prominent mandibles. The females especially show very long projecting mandibles and labrum. Males are characterized by a wedge-shaped projection that arises from sternite 2. This species is very similar to Chelostoma campanularum.

== Biology ==
The species has only one generation per year (univoltine). Adults fly from May to July. The females usually build their nests in old beetle burrows found in dead wood, but they also may use hollow plant stalks. It has a specialized preference (oligolecty) for the flowers of Ranunculus species (mainly Ranunculus acris, Ranunculus bulbosus, Ranunculus repens and Ranunculus lanuginosus). Recorded parasites of this species are Monosapyga clavicornis and Gasteruption jaculator.

== Bibliography ==
- E. Newman The zoologist: a popular miscellany of natural history, Volume 4
- Charles Duncan Michener The Bees of the World, Volume 1
