= Hawkley Warren =

Woodland in Hampshire, England

Coordinates: 51.05032°N 0.95993°W

Hawkley Warren (grid reference SU730284) is a woodland on the northeast-facing Wealden Edge, near the village of Hawkley, three miles north of Petersfield in Hampshire. The site is situated in a deep chalk combe.

The site is owned by Hampshire County Council and managed as a nature reserve jointly by the council and Hampshire and Isle of Wight Wildlife Trust. The woodland glades are kept open by coppicing.

== Site description ==
Beech is the dominant tree at this site although on some of the steeper slopes, Yew dominates; on the deeper soils in the valley bottom the woodland has a more open canopy of Ash and Hazel.

== Botanical interest ==
The site's primary interest lies in the fact that it is one of three sites in Britain where Red Helleborine Cephalanthera rubra remains; this orchid grows on a north-west facing slope. The others being Workman's Wood in Gloucestershire and Windsor Hill SSSI, a site in the Chilterns in Buckinghamshire. The species was first found at Hawkley Warren in 1986 by K. Turner and Ralph Hollins.

Other orchid species found growing under beech at this site include Bird's-nest Orchid, Early Purple Orchid and Narrow-leaved Helleborine; Spurge-laurel is also found.

Ramsons is found in the valley bottom and Herb Paris is also found here.

== Invertebrates ==
The Mountain Bulin snail Ena montana occurs here.
