= Hawkley =

Village and parish in Hampshire, England

Coordinates: 51.05627°N 0.93739°W

- Location within Hampshire
- Population: 497 (2011 Census including Empshott)
- OS grid reference: SU745290
- Civil parish: Hawkley
- District: East Hampshire
- Shire county: Hampshire
- Region: South East
- Country: England
- Sovereign state: United Kingdom
- Post town: Liss
- Postcode district: GU33
- Police: Hampshire and Isle of Wight
- Fire: Hampshire and Isle of Wight
- Ambulance: South Central
- UK Parliament: East Hampshire

Hawkley is a village, ecclesiastical parish and civil parish in the East Hampshire district of Hampshire, England. It is 3.5 miles (5.7 km) north of Petersfield, to the west of the A3 road.

The nearest railway station is 2.2 miles (3.5 km) to the southeast in the village of Liss.

Hawkley is situated in an area of outstanding natural beauty, sitting on the Hangers Way. Hawkley Warren, an important site for Red Helleborine, borders the village.

The village's St Peter and St Paul Church (with its Rhenish helm on its tower), and Hawkley Hurst house, were both designed by celebrated architect Samuel Sanders Teulon. The church is a listed building and there are 17 other listed buildings in the parish.

The village has a popular inn named The Hawkley Inn.

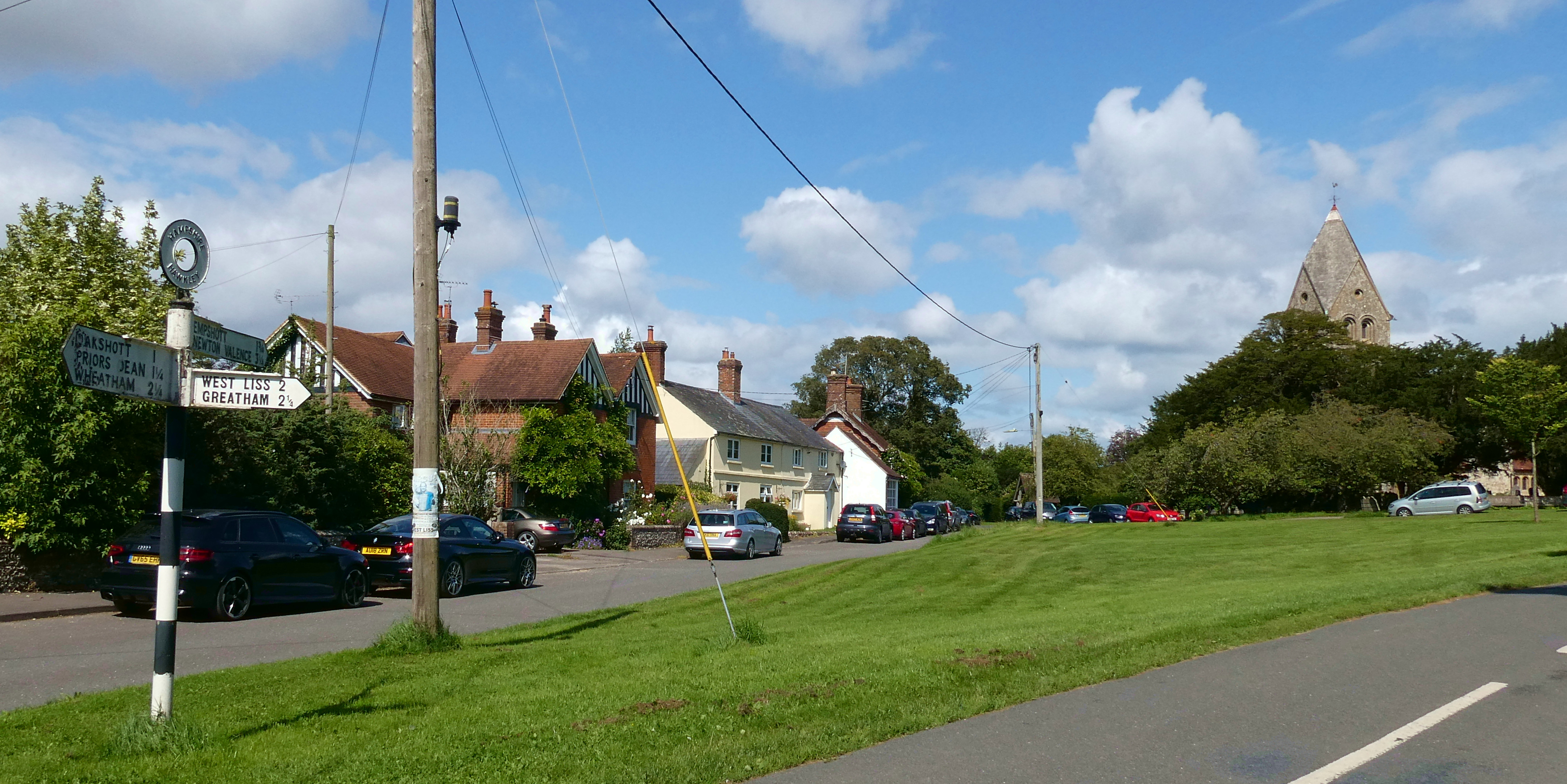
The green at Hawkley, Hampshire, England, with the tower of St. Peter and Paul church. August 2021.

== Notable people ==
- Dr Harry Roberts (1871-1946), doctor, author and philanthropist
- Lloyd Budd (1913–1986), first-class cricketer and international cricket umpire
