= Chelostoma californicum =

Scientific classification
- Domain: Eukaryota
- Kingdom: Animalia
- Phylum: Arthropoda
- Class: Insecta
- Order: Hymenoptera
- Family: Megachilidae
- Genus: Chelostoma
- Species: C. californicum

Binomial name
- Chelostoma californicum Cresson, 1878

Species of bee

Chelostoma californicum is a species of bee in the family Megachilidae. It is found in Central America and North America.
