= Ralph Hollins =

English naturalist (1931–2021)

J. R. W. (Ralph) Hollins (1931–2021) was a naturalist, born at Martin in the English county of Hampshire.

Hollins became active in Hampshire Wildlife Trust and Hampshire Ornithological Society during the 1980s, serving on committees of both organisations.

He is best known as the co-discoverer of Red Helleborine at Hawkley Warren, near Petersfield, in 1986, one of only three British sites where this species remained extant at the end of the 20th century.
