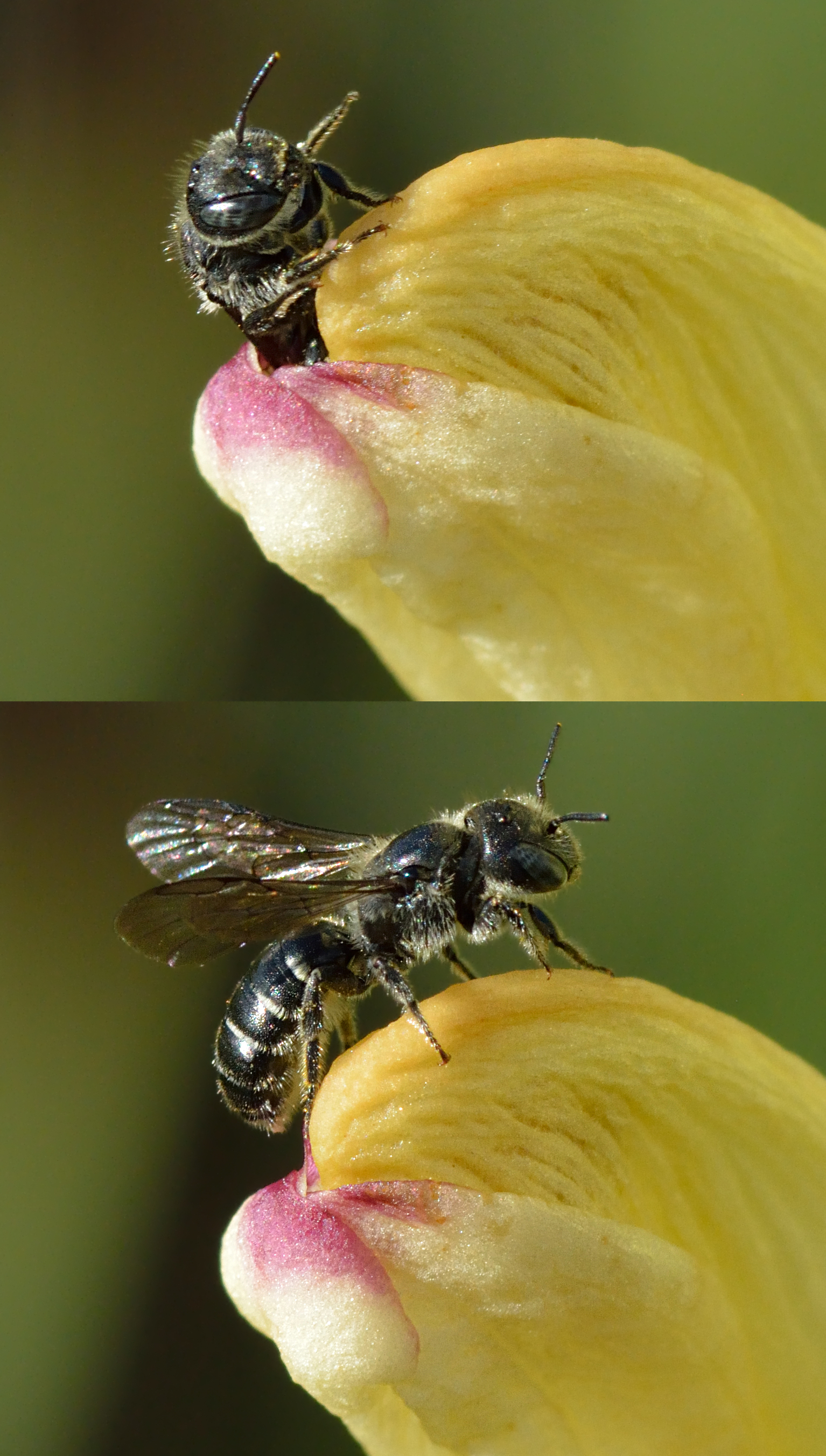

Scientific classification
- Kingdom: Animalia
- Phylum: Arthropoda
- Class: Insecta
- Order: Hymenoptera
- Family: Megachilidae
- Tribe: Osmiini
- Genus: Chelostoma
- Species: C. rapunculi

Binomial name
- Chelostoma rapunculi (Lepeletier, 1841)

= Chelostoma rapunculi =

Species of bee

Chelostoma rapunculi is a species of bee in the family Megachilidae. It is found in Europe and Northern Asia (excluding China) and North America.
