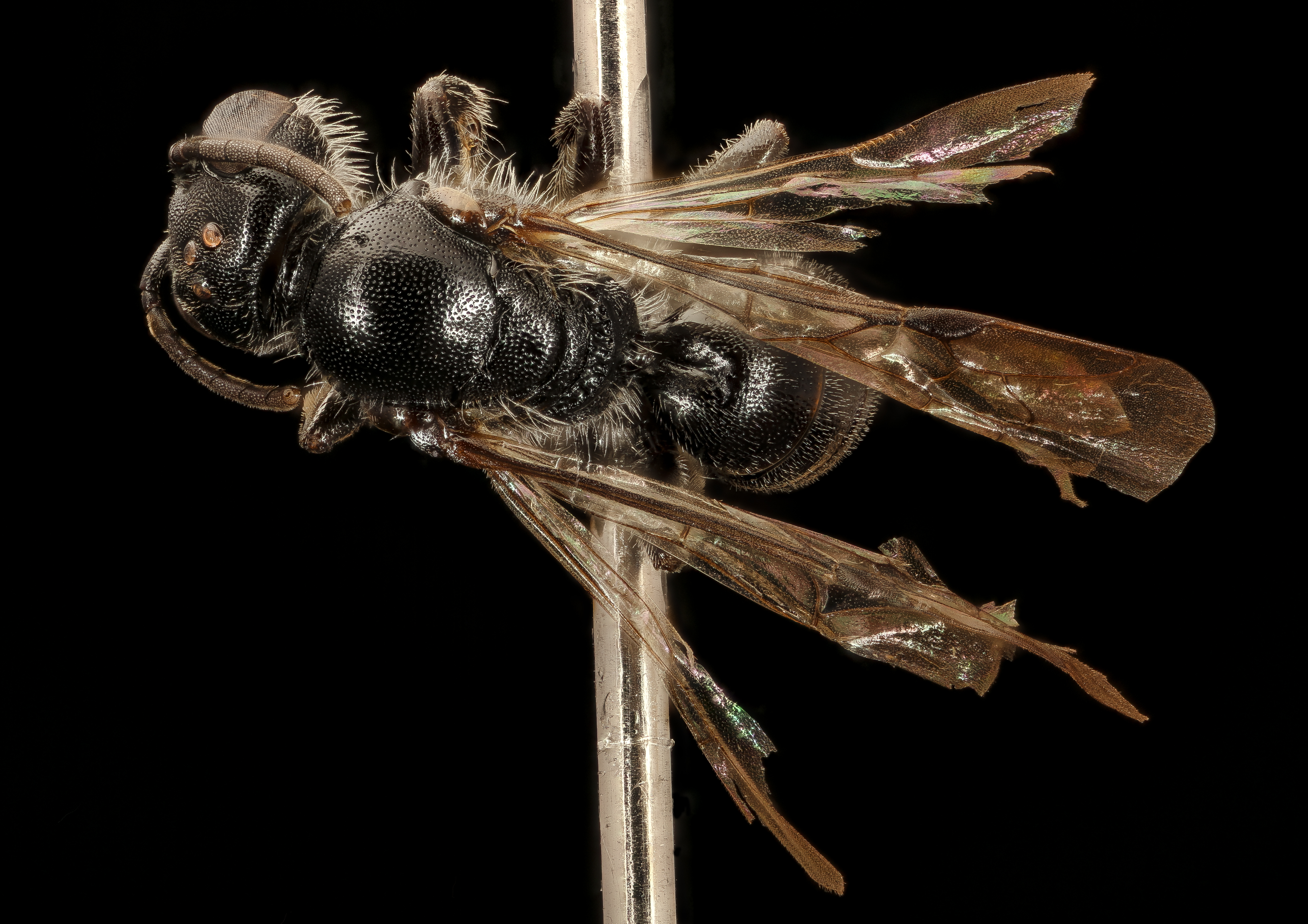

Scientific classification
- Domain: Eukaryota
- Kingdom: Animalia
- Phylum: Arthropoda
- Class: Insecta
- Order: Hymenoptera
- Family: Megachilidae
- Tribe: Osmiini
- Genus: Chelostoma
- Species: C. philadelphi

Binomial name
- Chelostoma philadelphi (Robertson, 1891)

= Chelostoma philadelphi =

Species of bee

Chelostoma philadelphi is a species of hymenopteran in the family Megachilidae. It is found in North America.
