= Windsor Hill =

Biological Site

Coordinates: 51.716969°N 0.807193°W

- Site of Special Scientific Interest
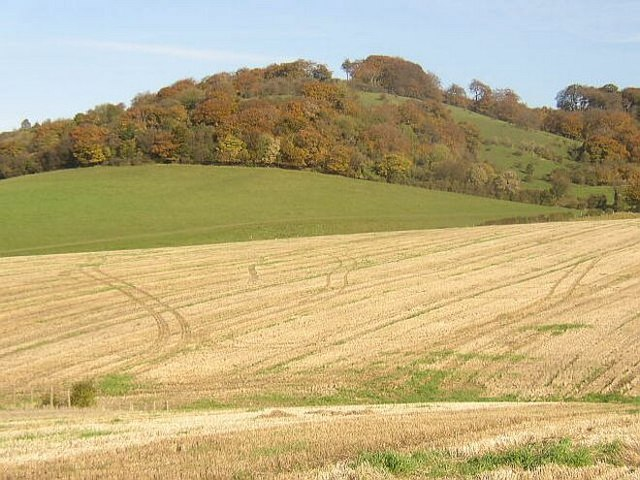
- Location of Windsor Hill.
- Area of search: Buckinghamshire
- Grid reference: SP825027
- Interest: Biological
- Area: 61.8 ha (153 acres)
- Notification date: 1984
- Location map: Magic Map

Windsor Hill is a 61.8-hectare (153-acre) biological Site of Special Scientific Interest near Princes Risborough in Buckinghamshire. It lies within the Chilterns Area of Outstanding Natural Beauty, and it is featured in the Nature Conservation Review. A small part is managed by the Berkshire, Buckinghamshire and Oxfordshire Wildlife Trust, and access to this area requires a permit.

== Site Description ==
The wood consists of an extensive tract of the Chiltern escarpment. It contains beech woodlands, scrub and chalk grassland. It is one of three extant British locations for the red helleborine orchid.

The beech woodlands incorporate communities characteristic of soils on the Clay-with-flints of the Chiltern plateau and the chalky deposits of the scarp slopes. Associated with the beech on the plateau are oak and occasional birch whilst on the slopes, the associated species are ash and whitebeam. Both even-aged and more mixed stands are represented, the latter typically with a shrub layer including gorse and honeysuckle on the plateau, and elder and hazel on the slopes.

On the plateau, brambles, bracken and rosebay willowherb occupy extensive patches, but a more mixed ground flora occurs between these, including creeping soft-grass (Holcus mollis), hairy brome (Bromus ramosus), tufted hair-grass (Deschampsia cespitosa), wood millet (Milium effusum) and wood melick (Melica uniflora). Pill sedge (Carex pilulifera), hairy wood-rush (Luzula pilosa) and slender St. John's-wort (Hypericum pulchrum) are found in more heathy areas, and the rushes Juncus effusus and J. conglomeratus are present in damper areas.

On the slopes dog's-mercury (Mercurialis perennis) and woodruff (Galium odoratum) are abundant, while more local species include nettle-leaved bellflower (Campanula trachelium), white (Cephalanthera damasonium), broad-leaved (Epipactis helleborine) and narrow-lipped (E. leptochila)helleborines, yellow bird's-nest (Monotropa hypopitys) and scaly male-fern (Dryopteris affinis).

Juniper scrub occurs on Windsor Hill itself, where it is associated with various other typical chalk shrubs and chalk grassland with an abundance of the moss Pseudoscleropodium purum and common valerian (Valeriana officinalis). There are patches of bare chalk with forget-me-nots (Myosotis species) and common mullein (Verbascum thapsus).

On Kop Hill, hawthorn dominates the scrub, and the grassland is less mossy. Several localised plant species such as squinancywort (Asperula cynanchica) chalk eyebright (Euphrasia pseudokerneri), horseshoe vetch (Hippocrepis comosa), autumn gentian (Gentianella amarella) and clustered bellflower (Campanula glomerata) occur. A further small area of chalk grassland dominated by wood false-brome (Brachypodium sylvaticum) and glaucous sedge (Carex flacca) occurs at the foot of Pink Hill.

23 species of butterflies have been recorded, including brown hairstreak (Thecla betulae), which requires scrub thickets and woodland edge habitats. The juniper colony supports several species of insects specific to this host plant. The snail fauna includes Abida secale, Helicella itala and Pomatias elegans.

There is access from Kop Hill Road and Peters Lane.
