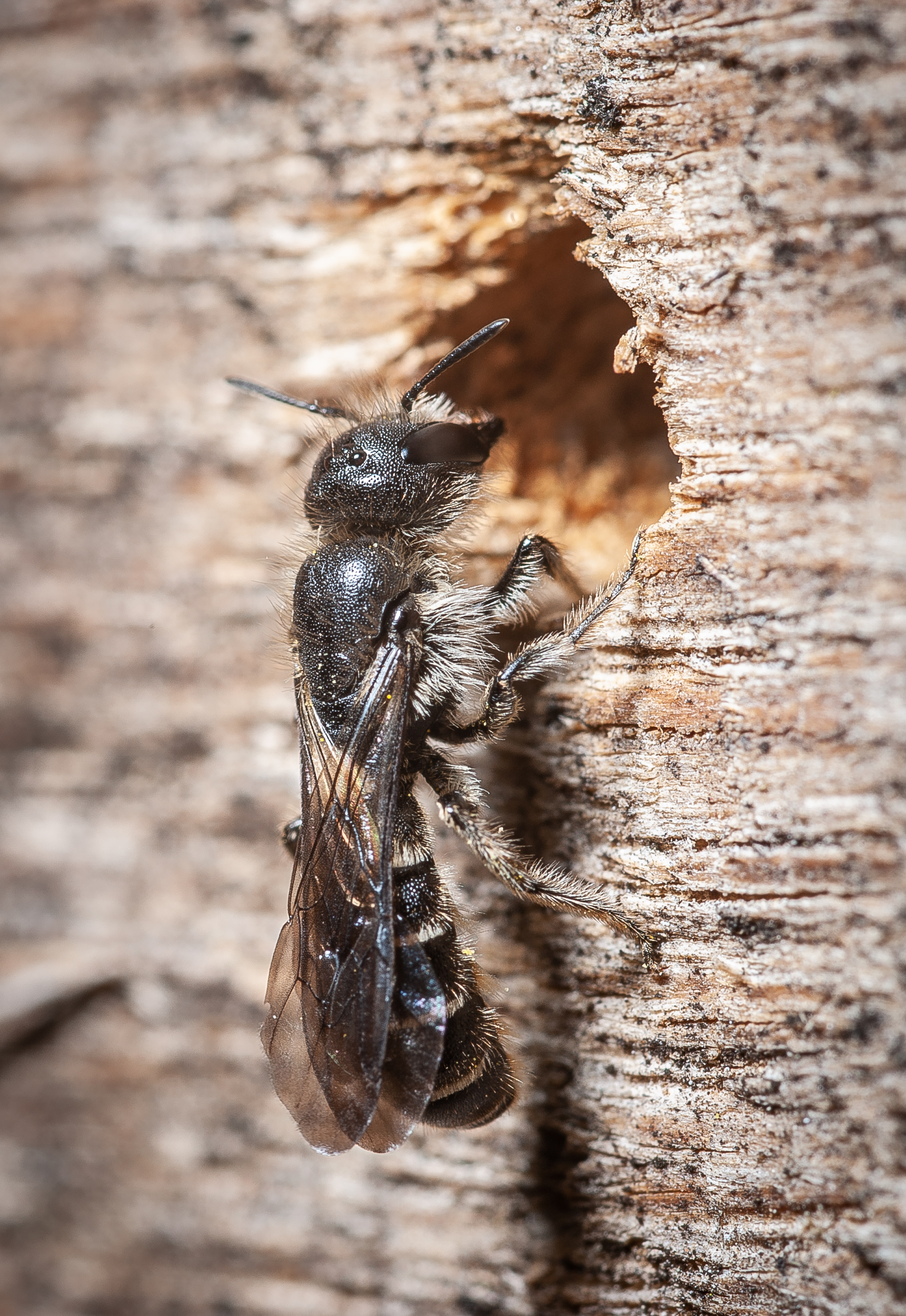
- Chelostoma florisomne

Scientific classification
- Domain: Eukaryota
- Kingdom: Animalia
- Phylum: Arthropoda
- Class: Insecta
- Order: Hymenoptera
- Family: Megachilidae
- Tribe: Osmiini
- Genus: Chelostoma; Latreille, 1809

= Chelostoma =

Genus of bees

Chelostoma is a genus of bees in the Osmiini tribe of the family Megachilidae. The genus is divided into 5 subgenera with at least 60 described species.

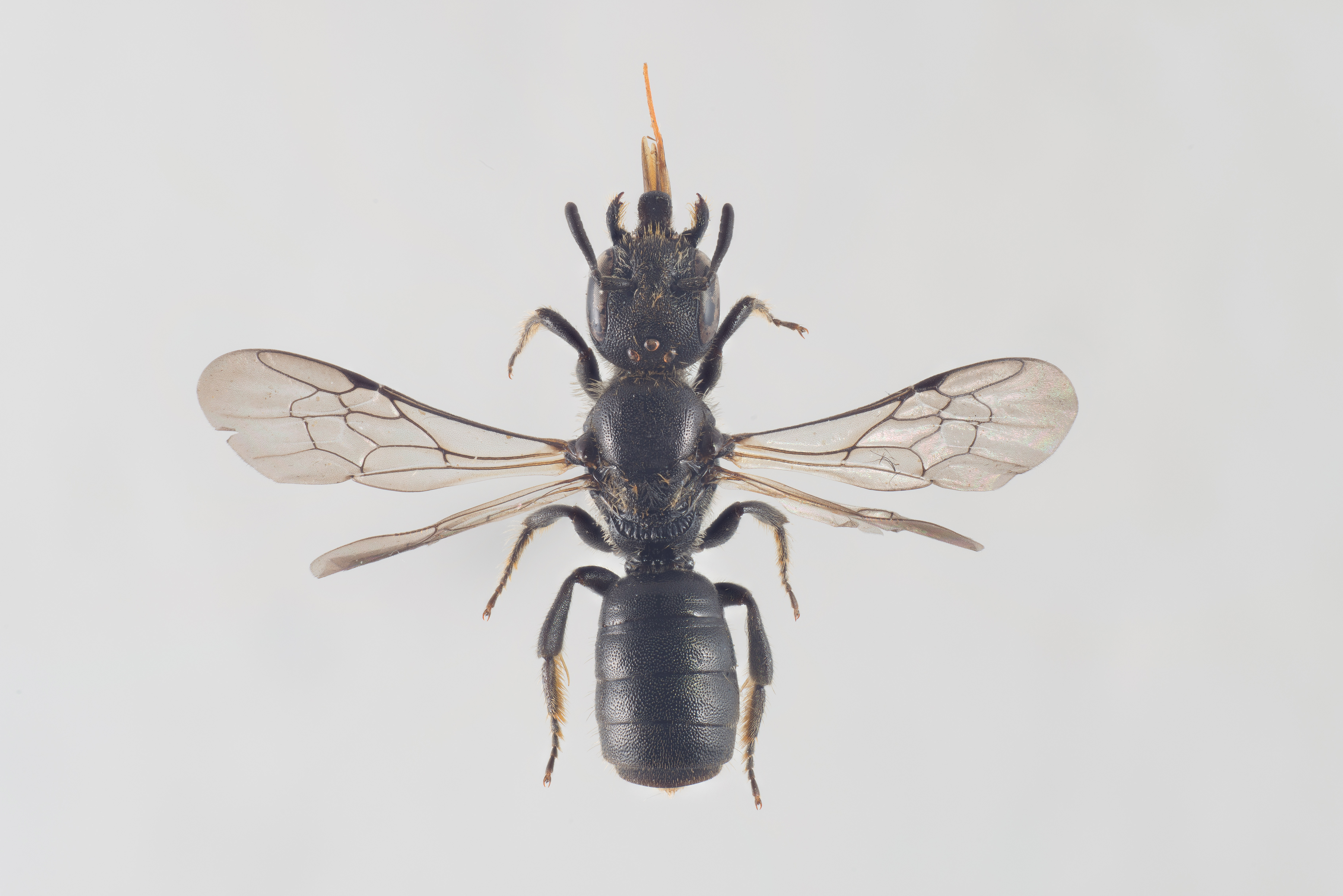
Chelostoma campanularum

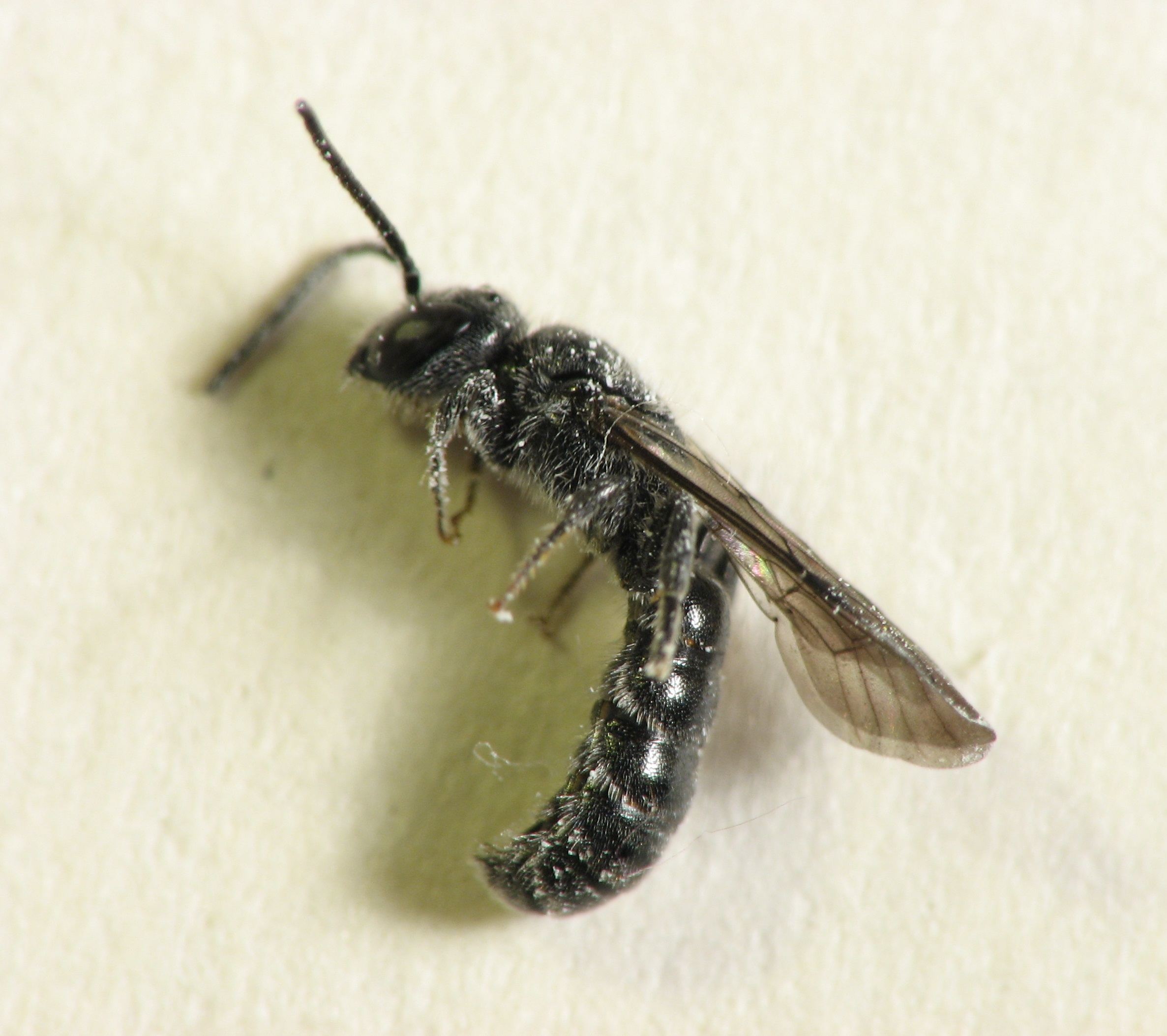
Chelostoma philadelphi, male

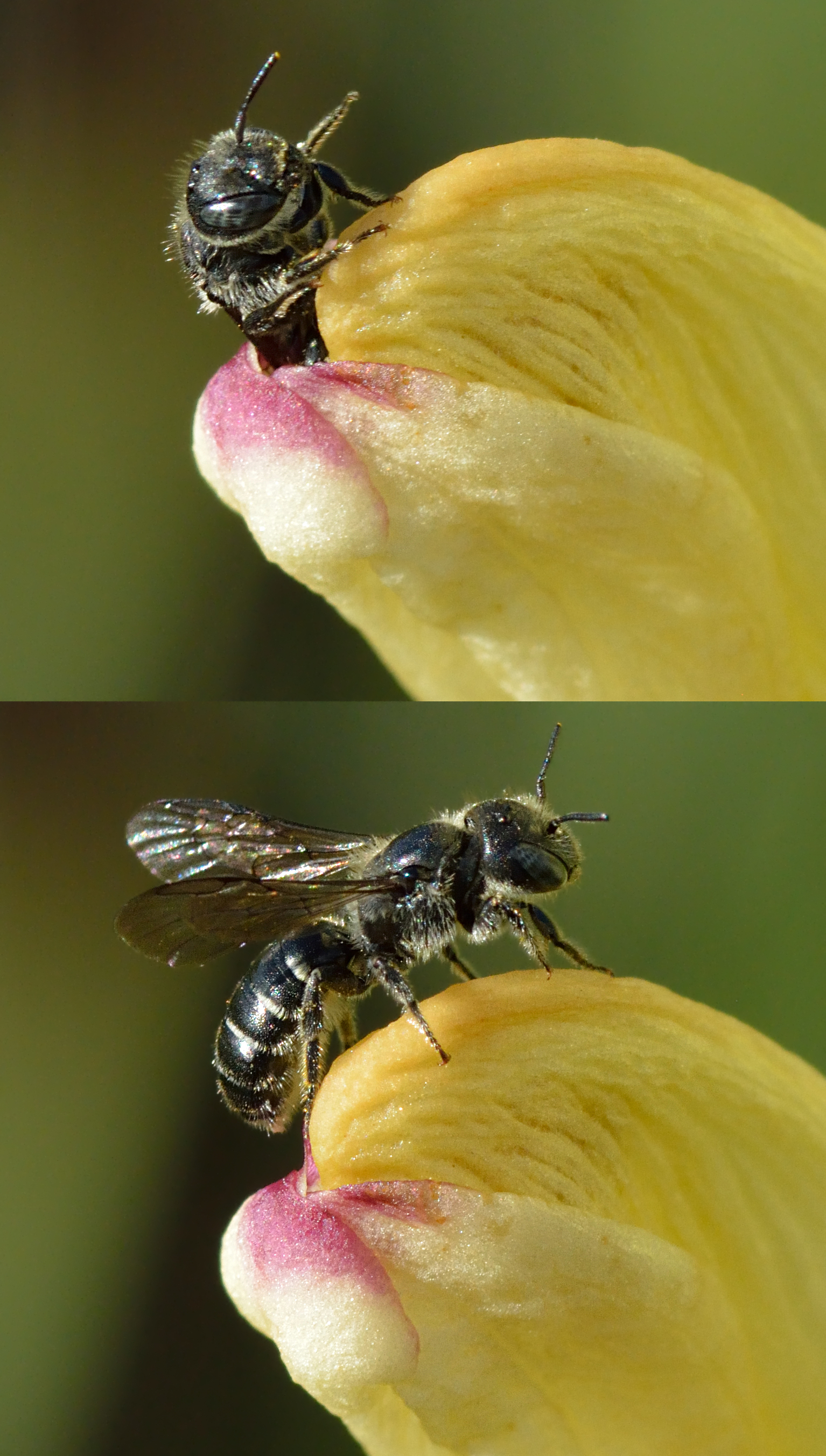
Chelostoma rapunculi

== Species ==
These 60 species belong to the genus Chelostoma:

- Chelostoma aegaeicum Muller, 2012^{g}
- Chelostoma aureocinctum (Bingham, 1897)^{i c g}
- Chelostoma bernardinum Michener, 1938^{i c g}
- Chelostoma bytinskii (Mavromoustakis, 1948)^{i c g}
- Chelostoma californicum Cresson, 1878^{i c g b}
- Chelostoma campanularum (Kirby, 1802)^{i c g b}
- Chelostoma carinocaudatum Wu, 2004^{i c g}
- Chelostoma carinoclypeatum Wu, 1992^{i c g}
- Chelostoma carinulum Pérez, 1895^{i c g}
- Chelostoma clypeale Muller^{g}
- Chelostoma cockerelli Michener, 1938^{i c g}
- Chelostoma comosum^{g}
- Chelostoma confusum (Benoist, 1934)^{i c g}
- Chelostoma diodon Schletterer, 1889^{i c g}
- Chelostoma distinctum (Stoeckhert, 1929)^{i c g}
- Chelostoma dolosum (Benoist, 1935)^{i c g}
- Chelostoma edentulum Pérez, 1895^{i c g}
- Chelostoma emarginatum (Nylander, 1856)^{i c g}
- Chelostoma florisomne (Linnaeus, 1758)^{i c g}
- Chelostoma forcipatum (Benoist, 1928)^{i c g}
- Chelostoma foveolatum (Morawitz, 1868)^{i c g}
- Chelostoma galeridum (Warncke, 1991)^{i c g}
- Chelostoma garrulum (Warncke, 1991)^{i c g}
- Chelostoma grande (Nylander, 1852)^{i c g}
- Chelostoma handlirschi Schletterer, 1889^{i c g}
- Chelostoma hebraeum (Benoist, 1935)^{i c g}
- Chelostoma hellenicum (Benoist, 1938)^{i c g}
- Chelostoma incertum Pérez, 1890^{i c g}
- Chelostoma incisulum Michener, 1938^{i c g}
- Chelostoma incognitum^{g}
- Chelostoma isabellinum (Warncke, 1991)^{i c g}
- Chelostoma josefi Schwarz & Gusenleitner, 2000^{i c g}
- Chelostoma lamellum Wu, 1992^{i c g}
- Chelostoma laticaudum (Benoist, 1938)^{i c g}
- Chelostoma longifacies^{g}
- Chelostoma longilabrare Wu, 2004^{i c g}
- Chelostoma lucens (Benoist, 1928)^{i c g}
- Chelostoma maidli (Benoist, 1935)^{i c g}
- Chelostoma marginatum Michener, 1938^{i c g}
- Chelostoma minutum Crawford, 1916^{i c g}
- Chelostoma mocsaryi Schletterer, 1889^{i c g}
- Chelostoma nasutum Pérez, 1895^{i c g}
- Chelostoma orientale Schletterer, 1890^{i c g}
- Chelostoma palaestinum (Benoist, 1935)^{i c g}
- Chelostoma petersi (Tkalcu, 1984)^{i c g}
- Chelostoma phaceliae Michener, 1938^{i c g}
- Chelostoma philadelphi (Robertson, 1891)^{i c g b}
- Chelostoma proximum Schletterer, 1889^{i c g}
- Chelostoma rapunculi (Lepeletier, 1841)^{i c g b}
- Chelostoma schlettereri (Friese, 1899)^{i c g}
- Chelostoma siciliae^{g}
- Chelostoma styriacum Schwarz & Gusenleitner, 1999^{i c g}
- Chelostoma sublamellum Wu, 1992^{i c g}
- Chelostoma subnitidum (Benoist, 1935)^{i c g}
- Chelostoma tetramerum Michener, 1942^{i c g}
- Chelostoma tonsum Muller^{g}
- Chelostoma torquillum (Warncke, 1991)^{i c g}
- Chelostoma transversum (Friese, 1897)^{i c g}
- Chelostoma ventrale Schletterer, 1889^{i c g}
- Chelostoma xizangense Wu, 1982^{i c g}

Data sources: i = ITIS, c = Catalogue of Life, g = GBIF, b = Bugguide.net
