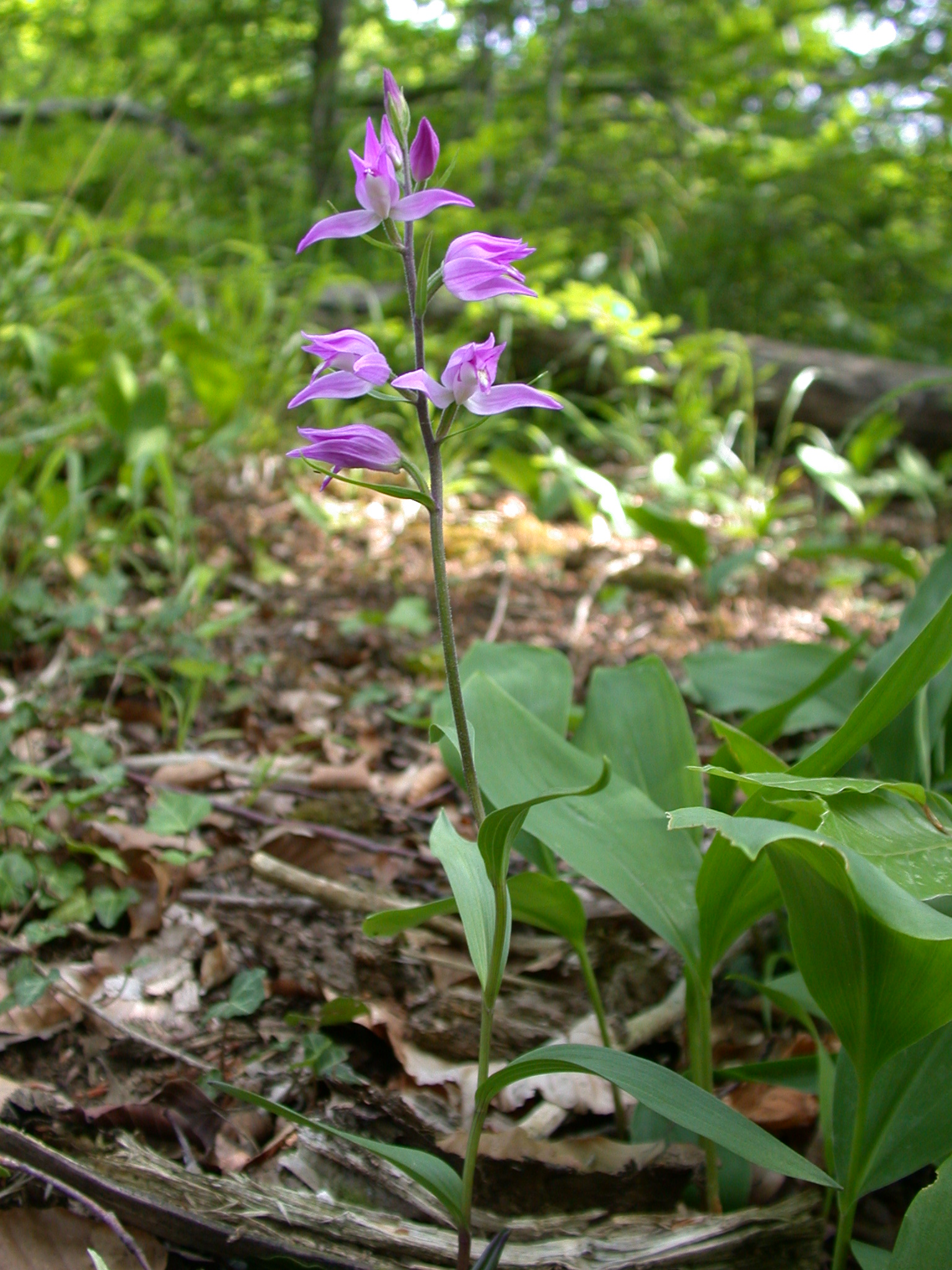

Scientific classification
- Kingdom: Plantae
- Clade: Tracheophytes
- Clade: Angiosperms
- Clade: Monocots
- Order: Asparagales
- Family: Orchidaceae
- Subfamily: Epidendroideae
- Genus: Cephalanthera
- Species: C. rubra

Binomial name
- Cephalanthera rubra (L.) Rich. 1817

Synonyms
- Serapias rubra L.; Epipactis rubra (L.) F.W.Schmidt; Cymbidium rubrum (L.) Sw.; Helleborine rubra (L.) Schrank; Dorycheile rubra (L.) Fuss; Limodorum rubrum (L.) Kuntze; Epipactis purpurea Crantz; Cephalanthera comosa Tineo in G.Gussone

= Cephalanthera rubra =

Species of orchid

Cephalanthera rubra, known as red helleborine, is an orchid found in Europe, North Africa and southwest Asia. Although reasonably common in parts of its range, this Cephalanthera has always been one of the rarest orchids in Britain.

== Description ==
Each flowering shoot reaches 20–70 cm height. The shoots grow from a creeping rhizome. The stem is smooth at the base and densely covered with short glandular hairs higher up. The shoots have between 2 and 8 lanceolate leaves which range in size from 5 to 14 cm long and from 1 to 3 cm wide. Each shoot may carry up to 20 flowers, which may be pink to red or rarely white. They are up to 5 cm wide. The petals are curved and lanceolate. Flowers are produced from May to July. It is known to sometimes go many years without flowering. Chromosomes 2n=36

Not to be confused with Epipactis atrorubens (dark red helleborine).

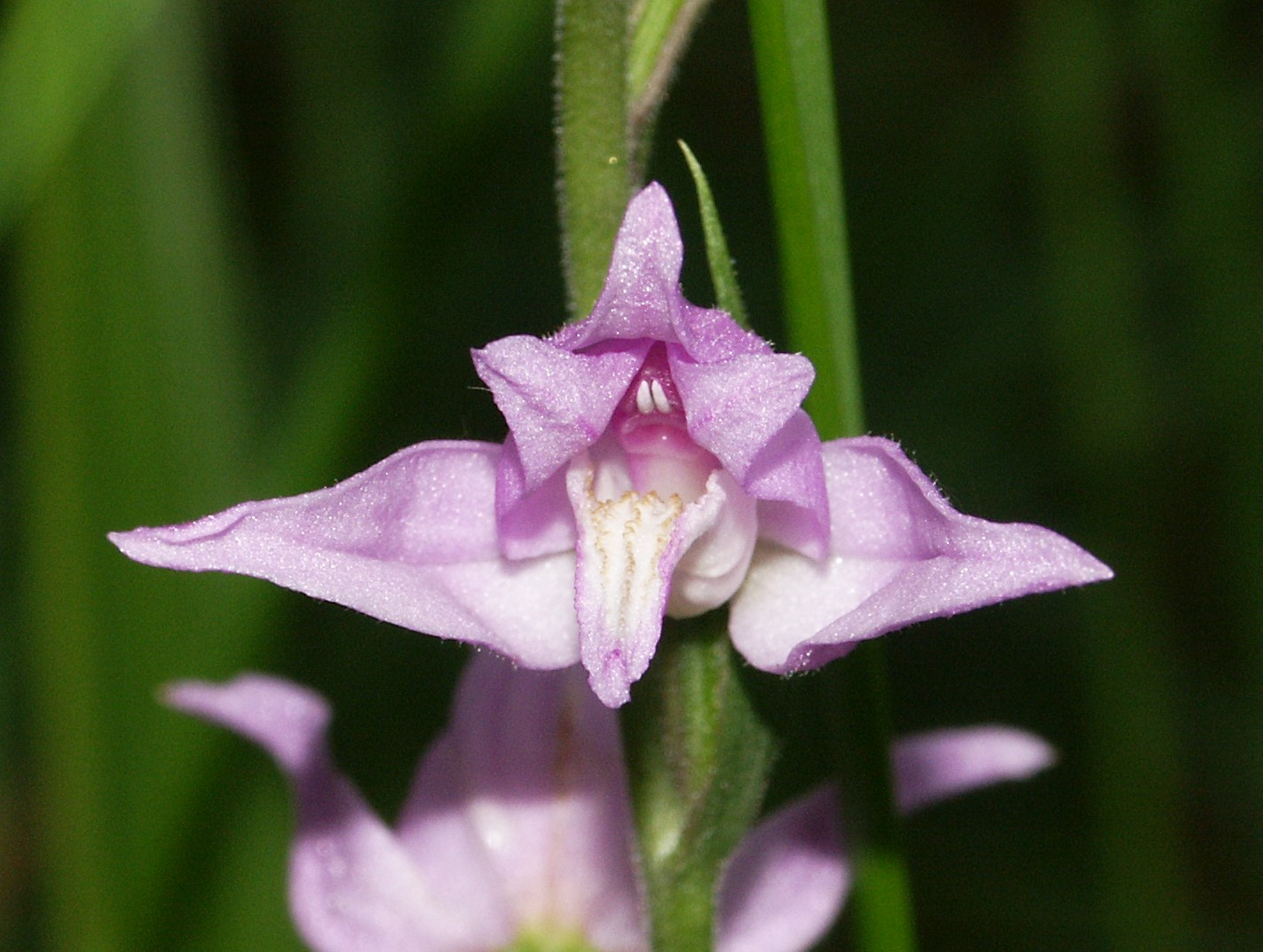
Close up image of the flower.

== Distribution and habitat ==
The red helleborine is found throughout most of Europe, east to the Urals and as far as 60 degrees north. It is however rare in Britain, the Low Countries and western France. It also occurs in Morocco, Algeria and Tunisia and in various parts of southern Asia as far east as Iran.

Found in light, dry forest, particularly among beech trees, pines and spruces. It grows to an altitude of 2,600 m (8,500 ft), especially on calcareous soils with a pH between 5.9–8.2. Flower colour is an indicator of the soil qualities, with darker blooms on more calcareous ground.

Red helleborine is a very rare plant in Britain. It is found only at the following sites:

- Workmans Wood, Sheepscombe, Gloucestershire
- Hawkley Warren, Hampshire, where it was first found in 1986.
- Windsor Hill SSSI, a woodland just to the east of Princes Risborough in the Chilterns, Buckinghamshire

During the 19th and early 20th centuries, the species was recorded from single sites in Somerset, Sussex and Kent, and a second Hampshire site (in the upper Test Valley). The species was also recorded at additional Gloucestershire sites (including Stanley Wood, King's Stanley, now a Woodland Trust woodland, and Uley), and persisted at some of these into the 1970s. It became a protected species in the UK in 1975 under the Conservation of Wild Creatures and Wild Plants Act.

== Ecology ==
Cephalanthera rubra is thought to be mainly pollinated by flies, although often self-pollination is triggered by rainfall. Pollination may also be carried out by Chelostoma bee (Chelostoma campanularum?) and the weevil Miarus campanulae, both of which are thought to mistake the flowers for Campanula persicifolia, a wildflower found on mountains in continental Europe. It is theorised that C. rubra mimics C. persicifolia to increase pollination early in the year.

As the flowers are frequently visited by flies, crab spiders have been observed hunting in them.

C. rubra forms a mycorrhizal relationship with species in the genera Leptodontidium, Phialophora and Tomentella. This enables it to access soil nutrients which would otherwise be unavailable.

== Etymology ==
Cephalanthera comes from the Greek κεφαλή ανθηρός, meaning "head flowering", thought to be a reference to the protruding position of the anthers. The species epithet rubra comes from the Latin for red, referring to the colour of the flowers. The Latin binomial was chosen by a French botanist named Professor Louis Claude Marie Richard.

"Helleborine" may refer to deer using the orchid for food (many conservationists have noted that helleborine orchids are grazed by deer). Alternatively it may denote that the plants are similar to hellebores (a group of species in the family Ranunculaceae). "Hellebore" comes from the Greek "álkē" and "bora", translating as "fawn" and "food of beasts".

In German, Cephalanthera are referred to as Waldvöglein, meaning little birds of the wood, a reference to the winged appearance of the flowers.

== Monitoring ==
The protection of red helleborine should aim to preserve specific forest biotopes for this species. During monitoring of this species, the number of shoots (vegetative and generative), leaf area and number of fruits are recorded. It is recommended to collect metrological data (sum of precipitation and air temperature), as well as data on shading, vegetation at the site, the presence of bells (Campanula sp.) in the vicinity and the abundance of dead wood.
