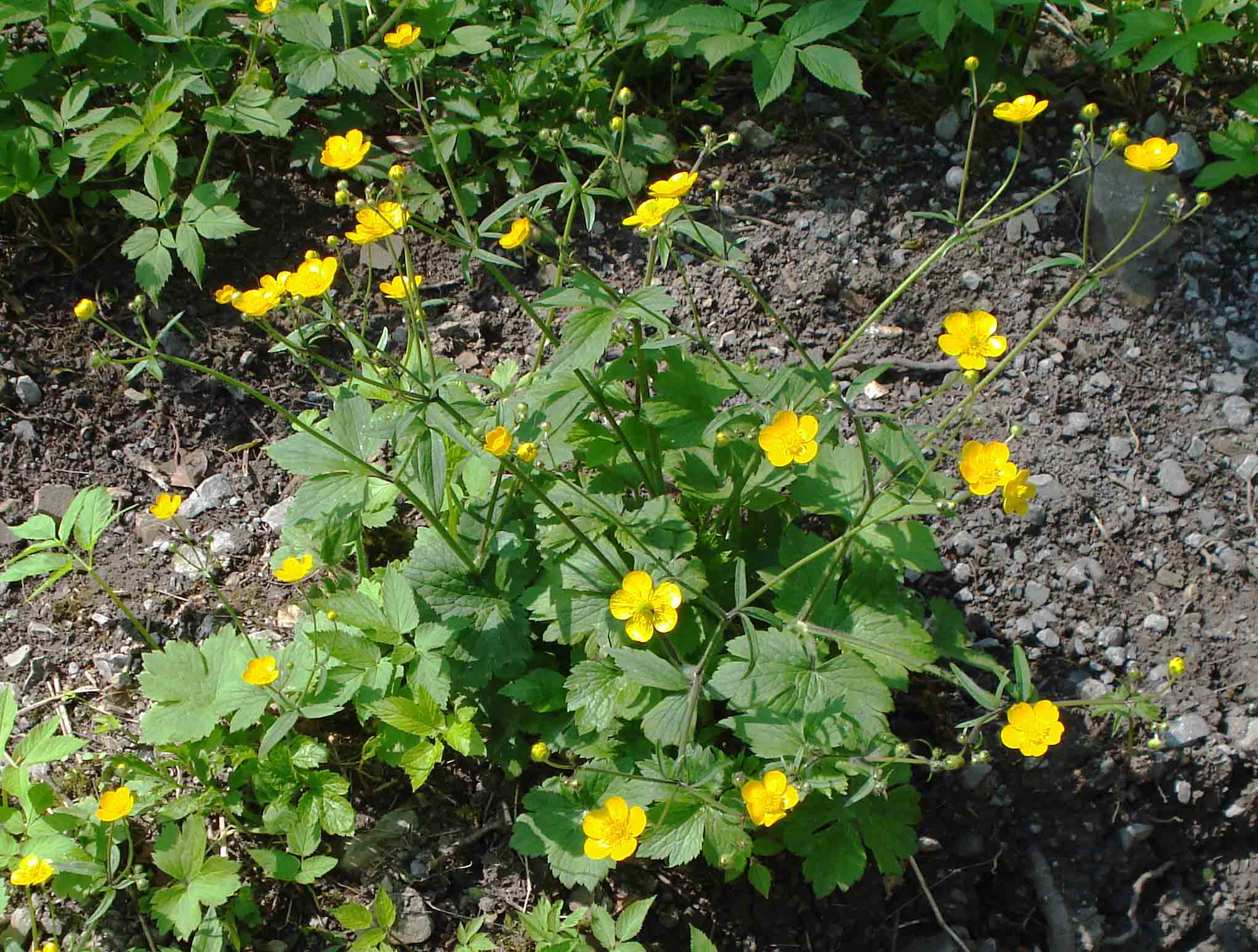

Scientific classification
- Kingdom: Plantae
- Clade: Tracheophytes
- Clade: Angiosperms
- Clade: Eudicots
- Order: Ranunculales
- Family: Ranunculaceae
- Genus: Ranunculus
- Species: R. lanuginosus

Binomial name
- Ranunculus lanuginosus L., 1753

Synonyms
- Ranunculastrum lanuginosum (L.) Fourr.; Ranunculus lanuginosus f. umbrosus (Ten. & Guss.) Rouy & Foucaud, 1893; Ranunculus umbrosus Ten. & Guss.; Ranunculus velutinus Schur

= Ranunculus lanuginosus =

Species of plant

Ranunculus lanuginosus, commonly known as the wooly buttercup and downy buttercup, is a herbaceous perennial plant species in the family Ranunculaceae, that grows in some parts of Europe.

== Etymology ==
The plant's genus name comes from a Latin term rana, which means "frog", referring to the buttercup's typical moist and shaded habitats. On the other hand, species' name lanuginosus derives from a Latin word lanugo, which is translated as "downy" and refers to the plant's stem, covered with a layer of fine hair.

== Taxonomy ==
This species was first described by Swedish naturalist Carl Linnaeus in his famous work Species plantarum in 1753.

There are a few recognized varieties of this species:

- Ranunculus lanuginosus var. geraniifolius DC., 1817
- Ranunculus lanuginosus var. lanuginosus
- Ranunculus lanuginosus var. parvulus DC., 1824
- Ranunculus lanuginosus var. umbrosus (Ten. & Guss.) P.Fourn., 1936

== Description ==
Ranunculus lanuginosus is herbaceous and perennial buttercup that can reach from 30 to 80 centimetres of height. It is usually an upright-growing and spread out plant that has stem with dense layer of trichomes. This species' stem is round and thick, as well as hollow. Its basal leaves have long leafstalk and are palmately lobed; with five segments being ovate and hirsute, while having double serrated margin. Upper stem leaves are sessile and palmately lobed, with wide segments. In most cases, leaves measure 12 centimetres in length and 8 centimetres in width.

Ranunculus lanuginosus is an entomophilous species that flowers between May and August. This buttercup has yellow to orange flowers with darker middle area and five floral leaves in both corolla and calyx. Each flower measures from 2 to 2.5 centimetres. Calyx has hairy sepals. The plant's fruit is so-called achene; it is hairless and laterally squeezed, while it ends with long and curved rostrum.

As many other buttercups, wooly buttercup is toxic.

== Distribution ==
Ranunculus lanuginosus is a European plant species that occurs in middle and southern Europe, as well as in Caucasus. R. lanuginosus is a native species of Albania, Austria, Baltic States, Bulgaria, Corsica, Czechoslovakia, Denmark, France, Germany, Greece, Hungary, Italy, Poland, Romania, Sardinia, Sicilia, Switzerland, Turkey (in Europe), Ukraine and former Yugoslavian countries.

This relatively common buttercup species can be found growing in various shaded forests with dense undergrowth, as well as in other similar shaded and humid places. The Raunkiær system classifies it as a hemicryptophyte species. Ranunculus lanuginosus is primarily a lowland species that only rarely grows in subalpine zone with maximal elevations of around 1,400.

== Gallery ==
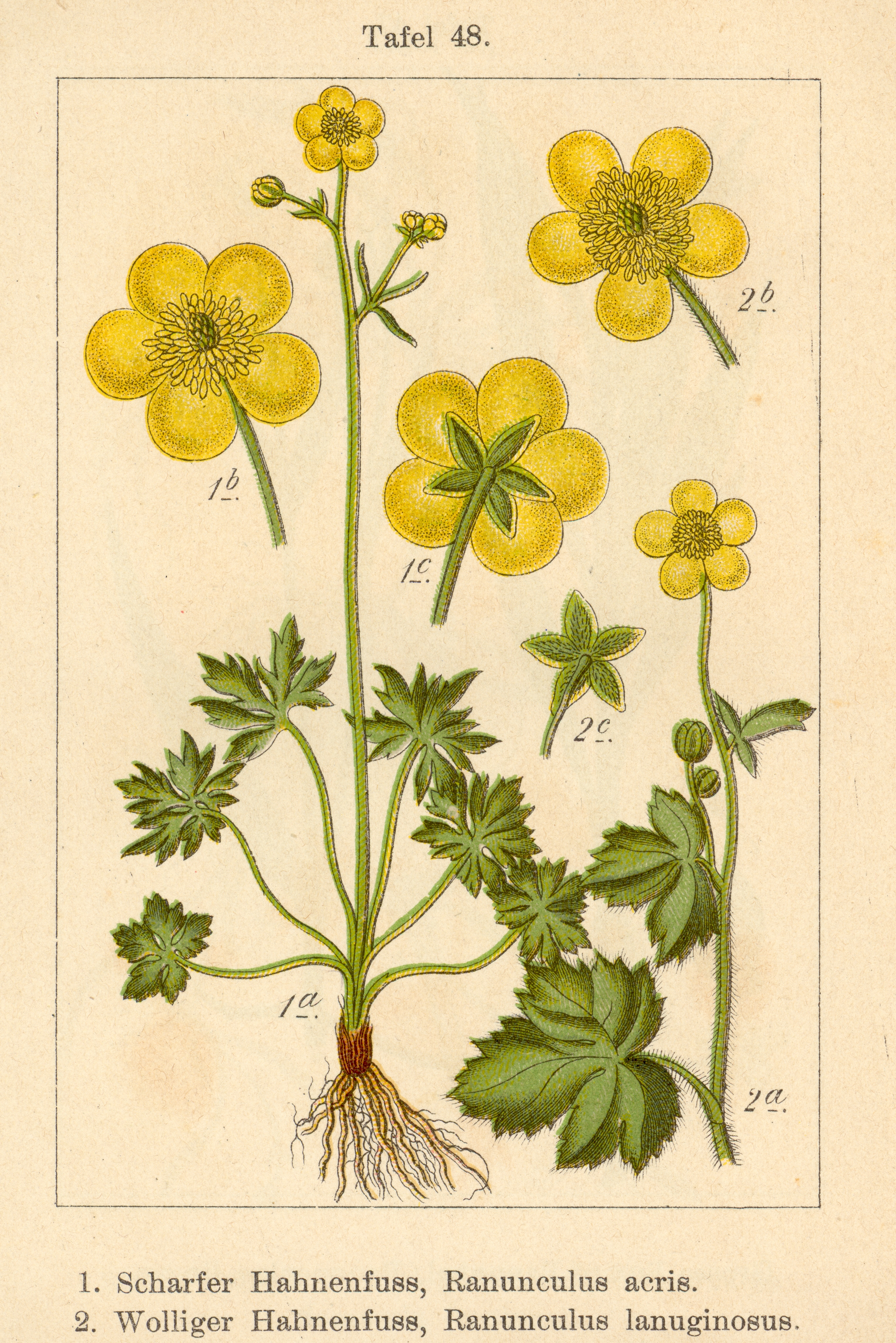

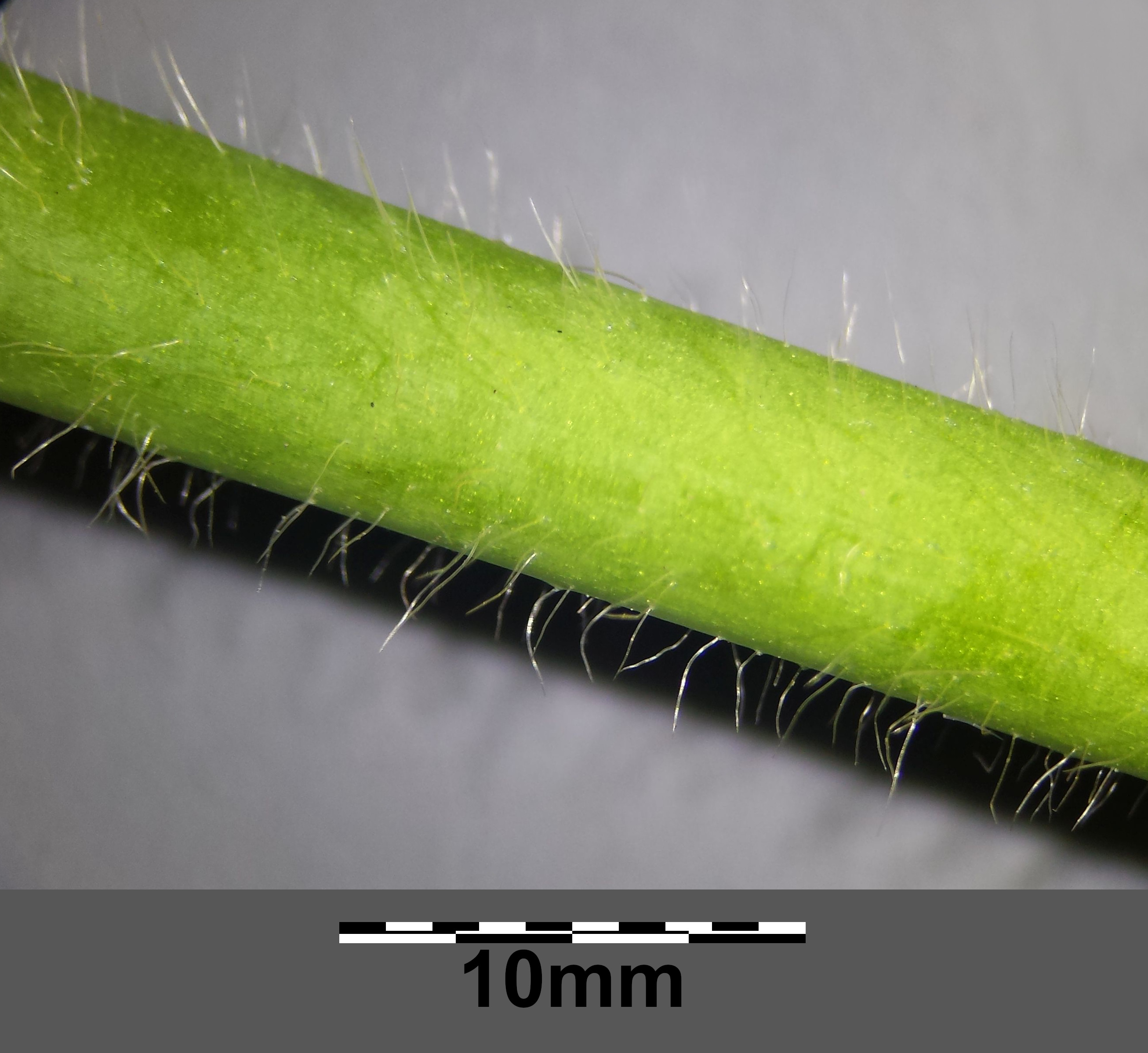

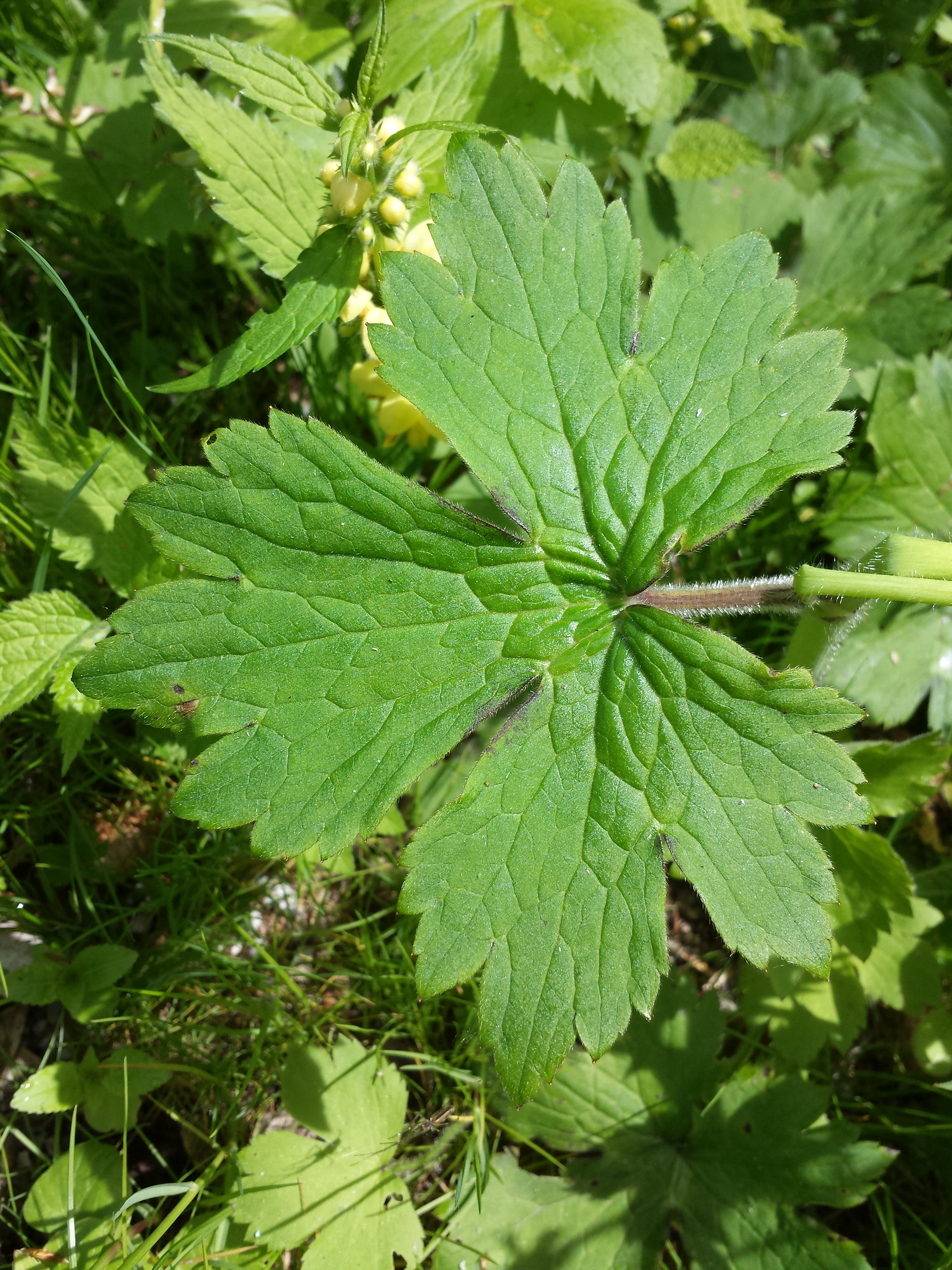

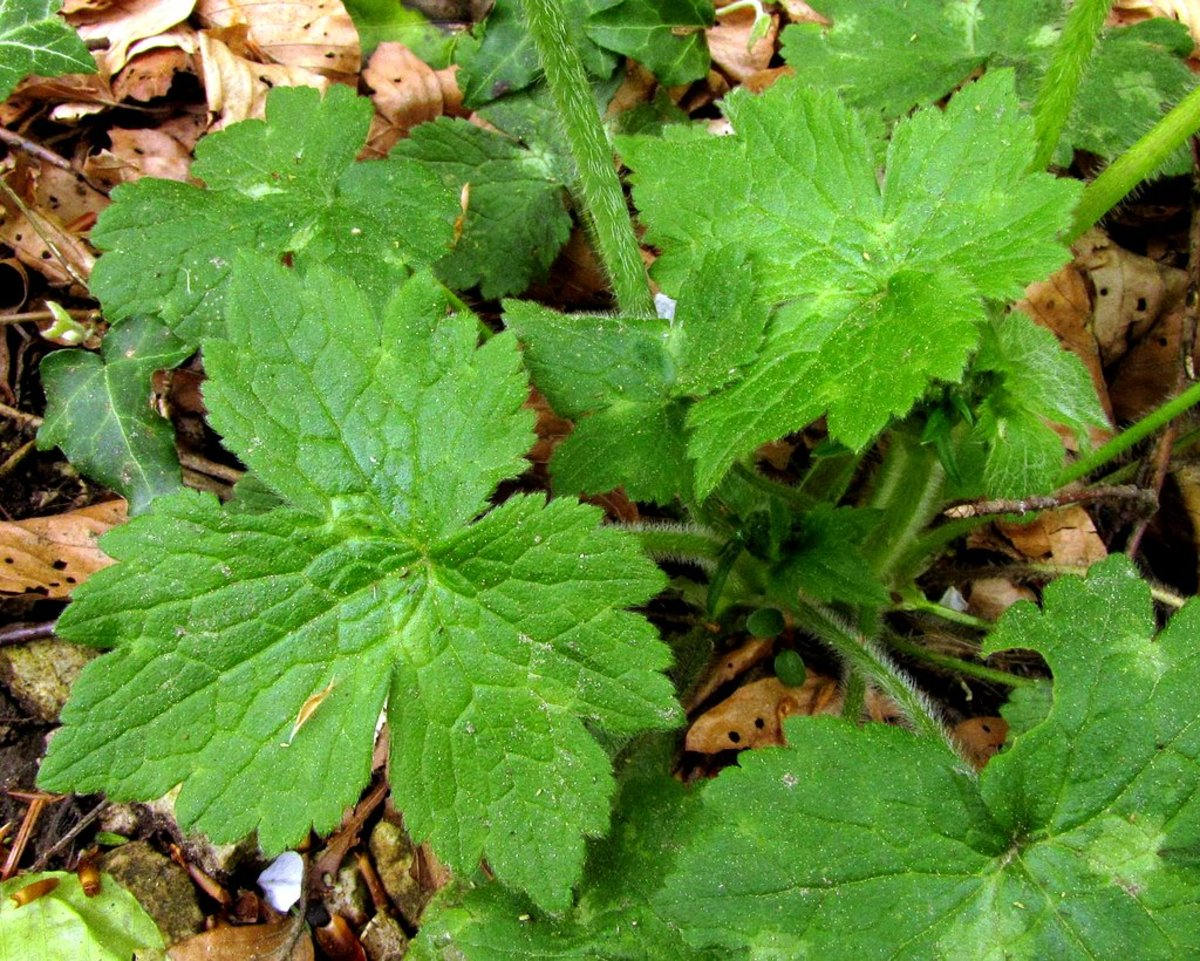

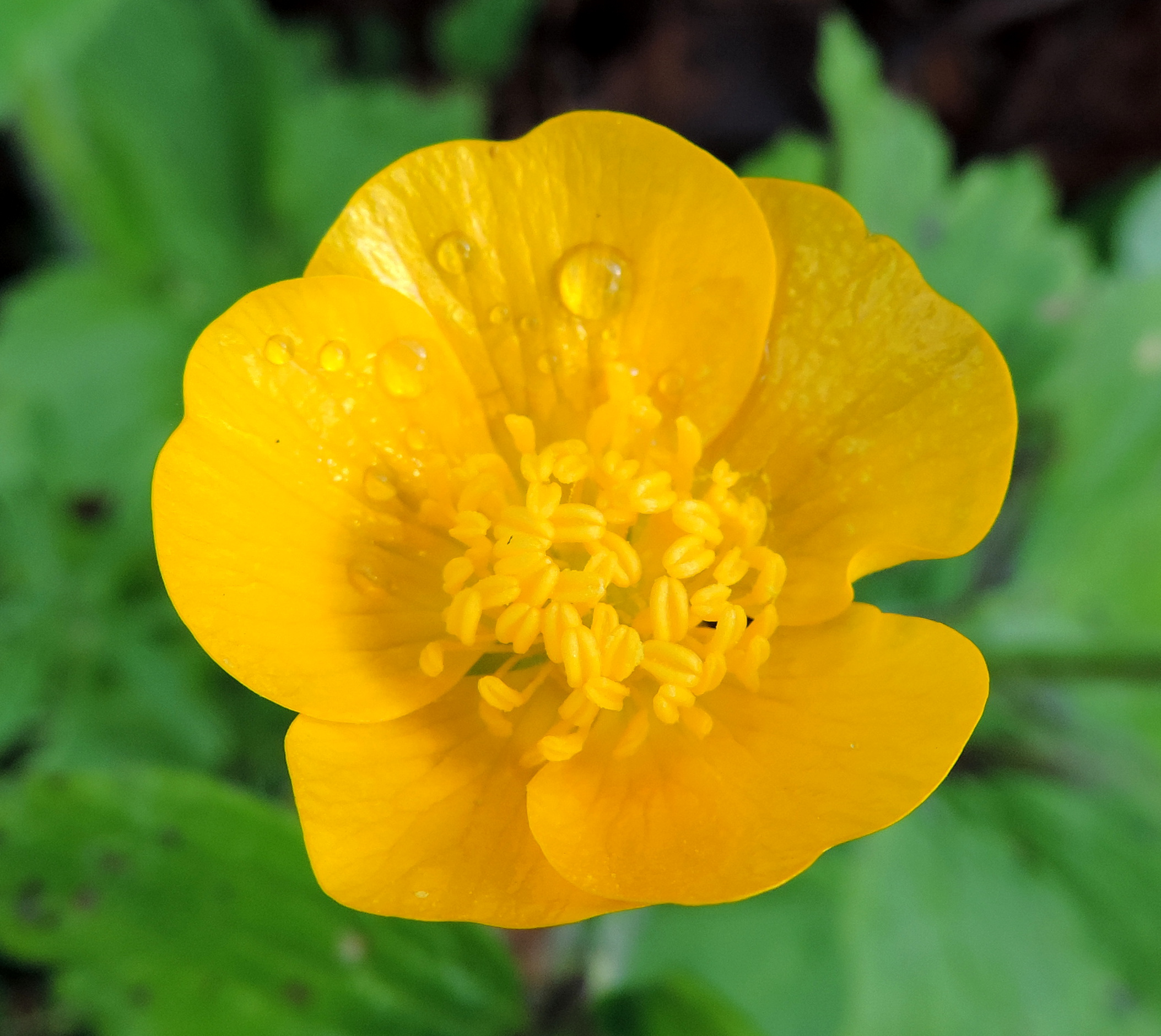

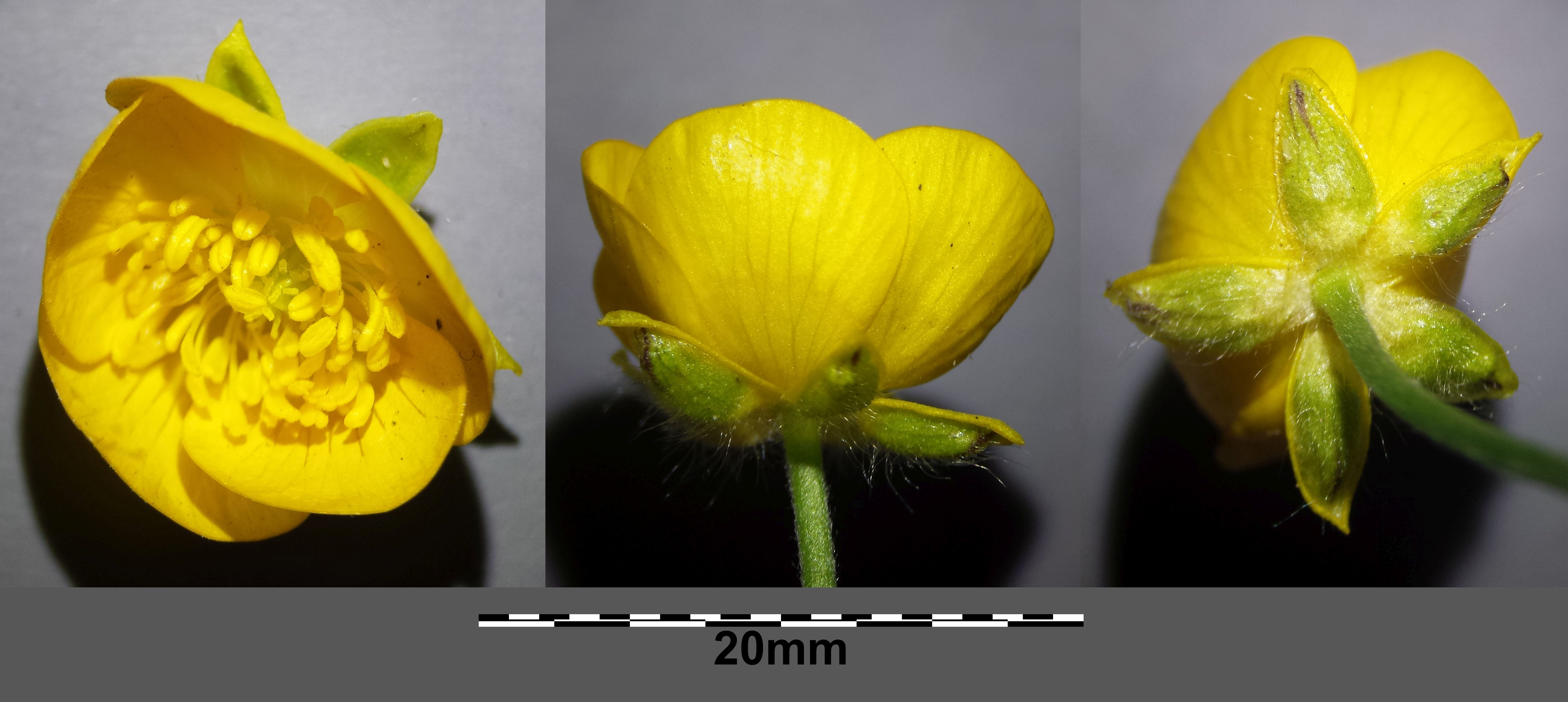

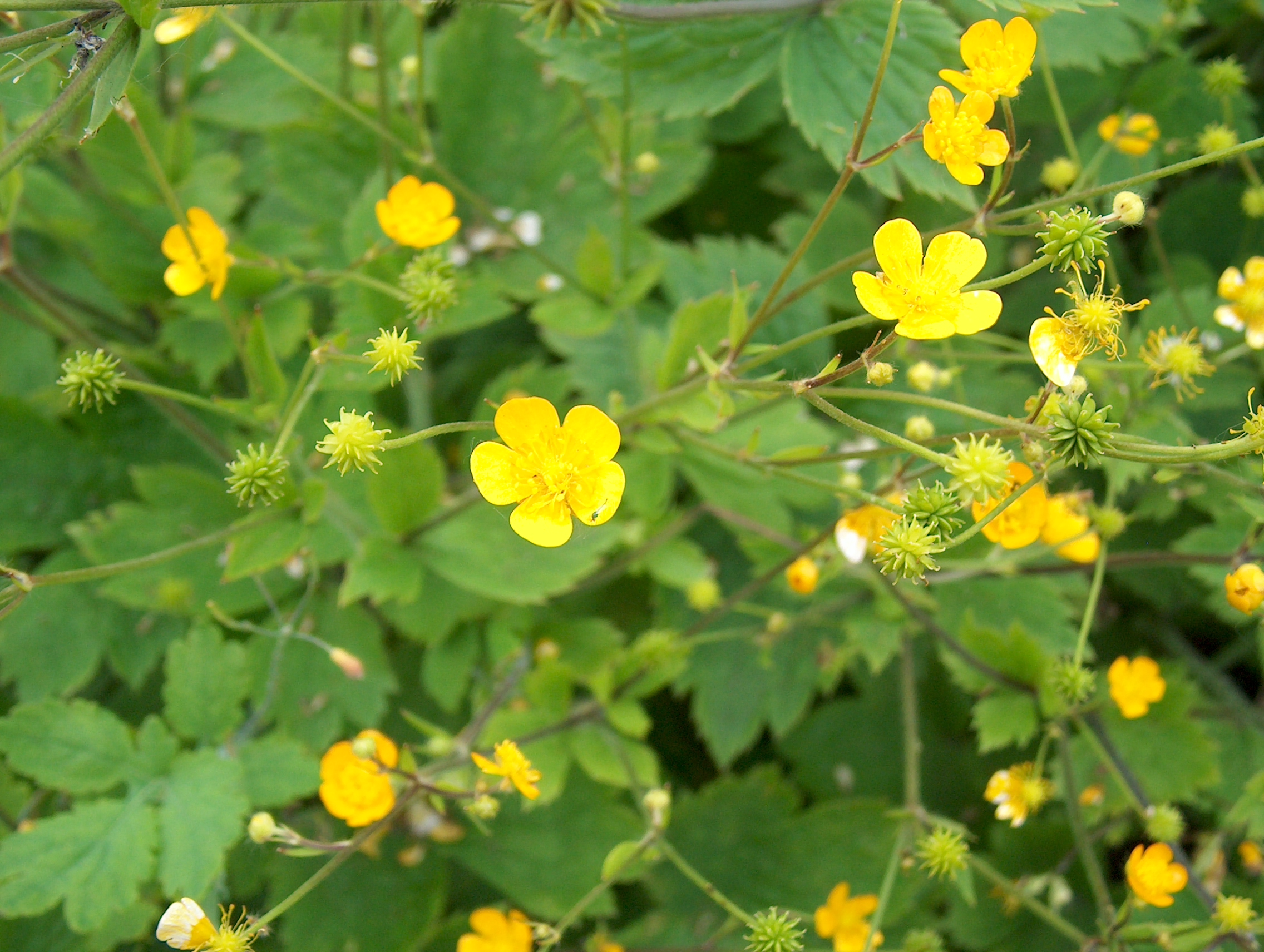

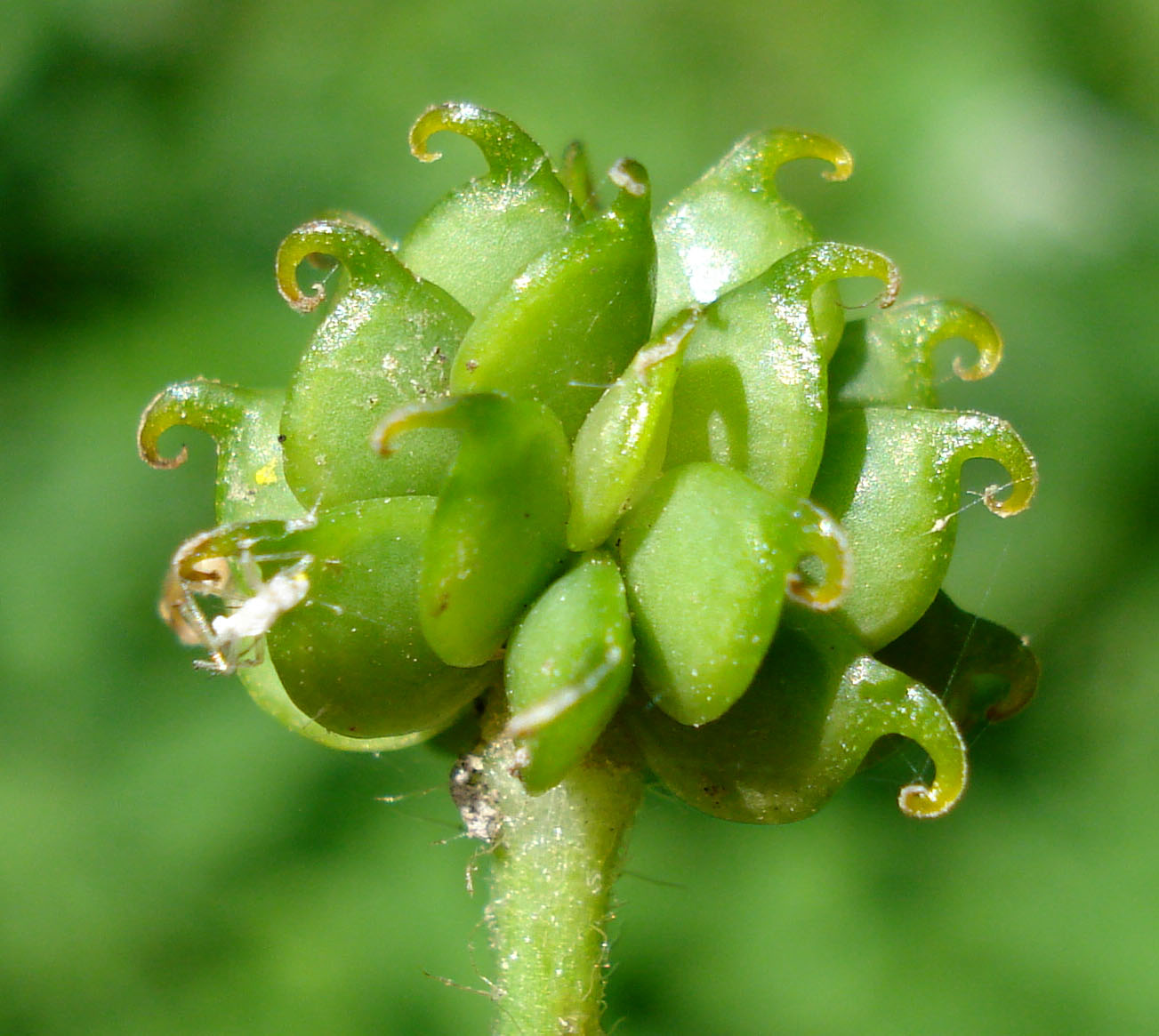
