= Workmans Wood, Sheepscombe =

Woodland in Gloucestershire, England

Coordinates: 51.79666°N 2.14641°W

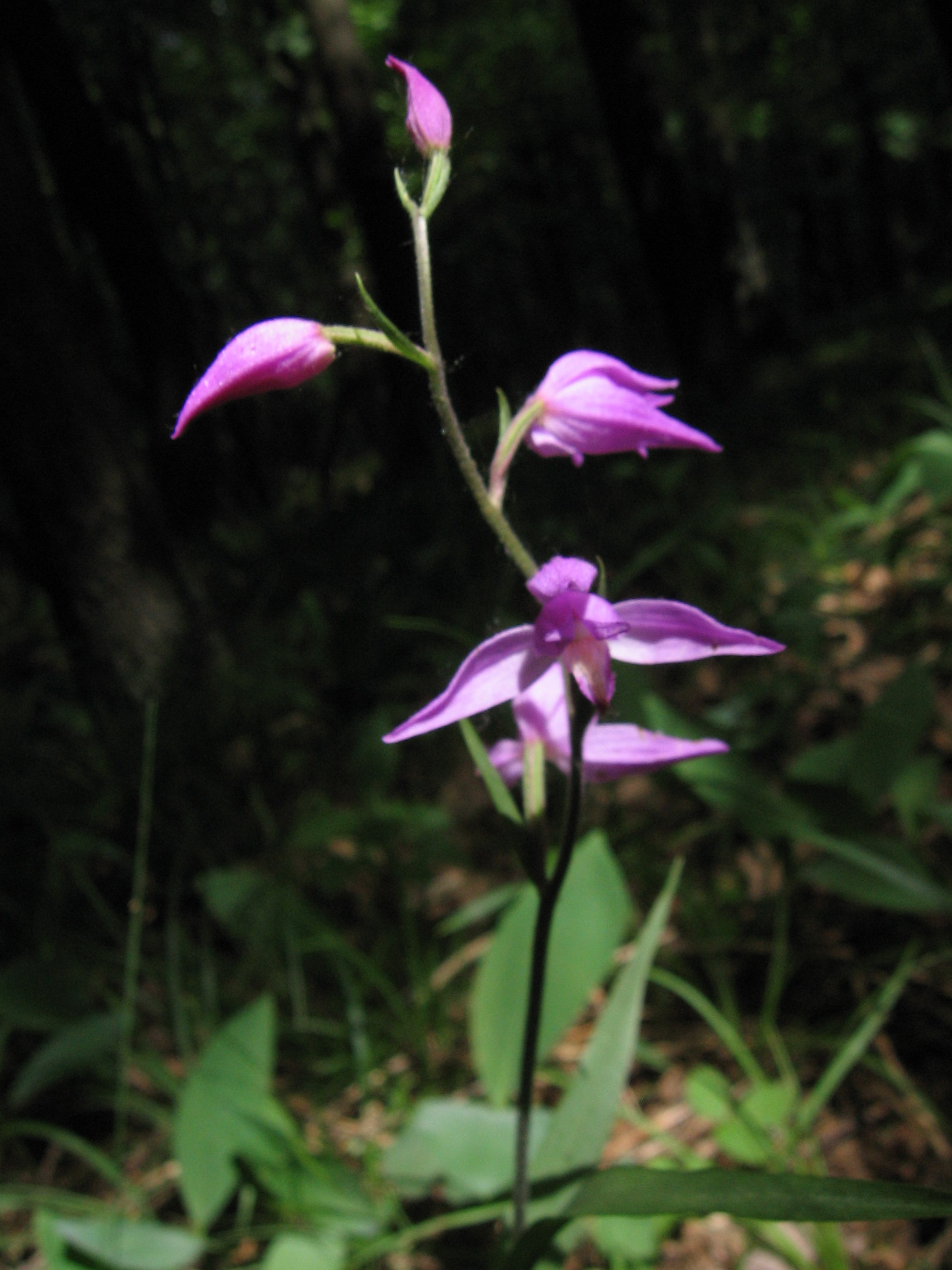
Example - Red Helleborine in a woodland setting (Cephalanthera rubra)

Shown within Gloucestershire

Workmans Wood (grid reference SO900109) is a wood just to the east of the village of Sheepscombe, in the Cotswolds, Gloucestershire. It is a biological Site of Special Scientific Interest being part of the Cotswold Commons And Beechwoods SSSI. The Wood is part of a designated national nature reserve (NNR).

== Significant species ==
It is of particular importance as one of only three extant sites in Britain for the Red Helleborine Cephalanthera rubra.

A small colony of this plant grows in the centre of the wood. Netting is used to protect the plants from disturbance.
