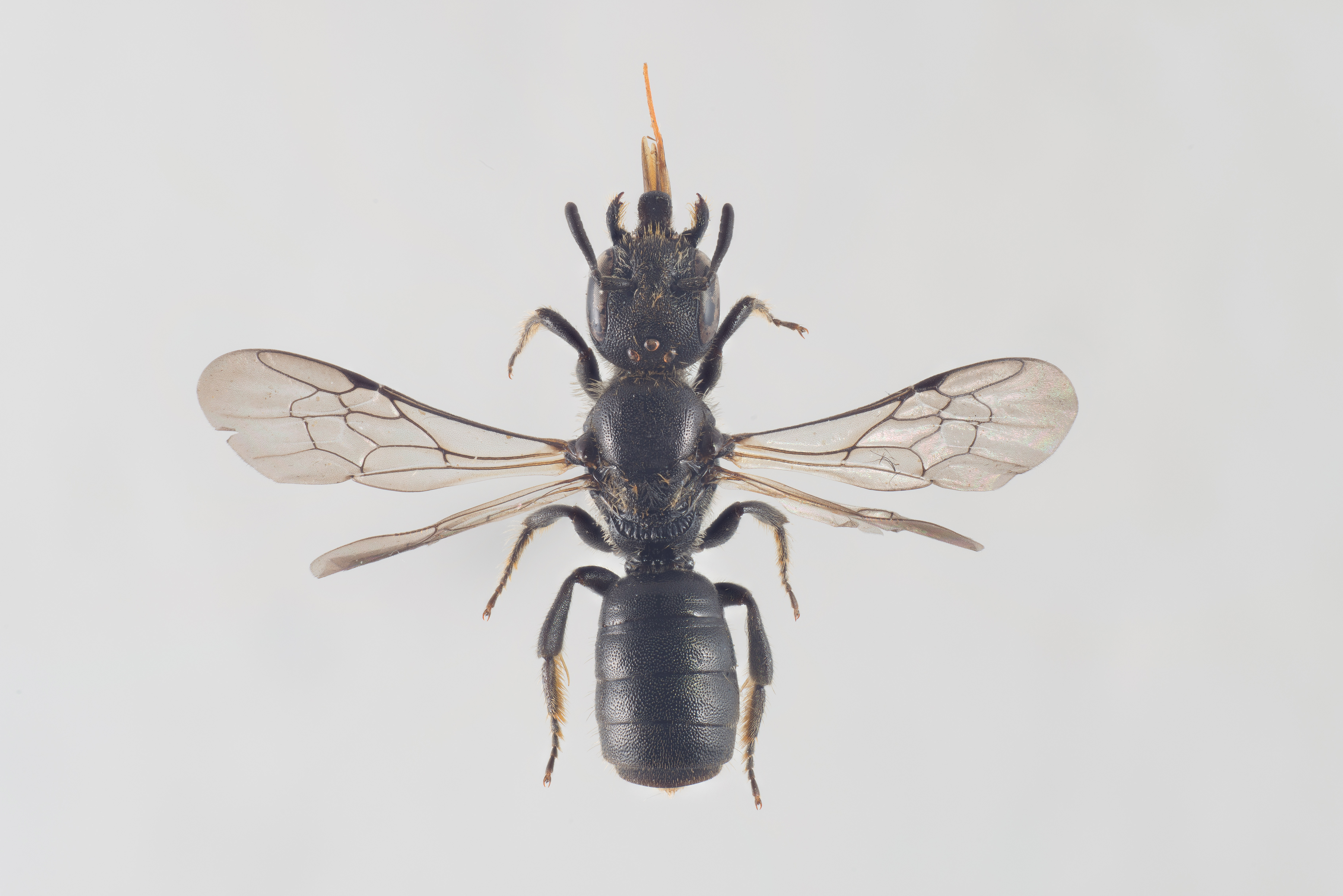

Scientific classification
- Domain: Eukaryota
- Kingdom: Animalia
- Phylum: Arthropoda
- Class: Insecta
- Order: Hymenoptera
- Family: Megachilidae
- Genus: Chelostoma
- Species: C. campanularum

Binomial name
- Chelostoma campanularum (Kirby, 1802)

= Chelostoma campanularum =

Species of bee

Chelostoma campanularum, or the harebell carpenter bee, is a species of hymenopteran in the family Megachilidae. It is found in Europe and Northern Asia (excluding China) and North America.

The bee is small and black (6-7mm) with a single flight period from mid-June to mid-August. The male has a two-pronged peg on the final segment of the abdomen and the female has snow white pollen collecting hairs on the underside. It is most easily seen on Bellflowers (Campanula species) and Sheep's bit.

To collect the pollen the female brushes the hairs on the underside of her abdomen on to the pollen using her back legs and using her front legs and mandibles to grip on to the anthers of the flower. The males can often be found in the same flower. Mating takes place in the flowers.

In order to encourage the bee, naturalists plant a variety of Bellflower species and provide dry reed stems that the bees use as nesting sites.
